= List of Formica species =

This is a list of the extant and extinct (†) species in the genus Formica which includes wood ants, mound ants, and field ants. As of 2026, Formica contains 221 valid species, split between 181 extant and 40 extinct.

== Extant ==
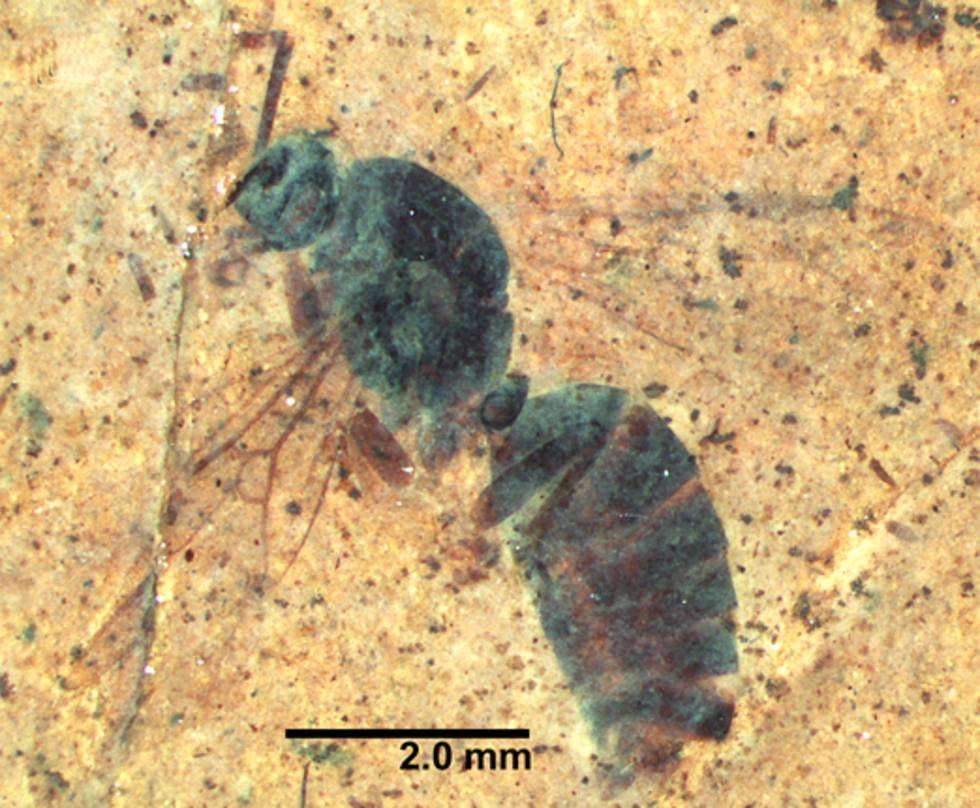
†Formica annosa holotype male

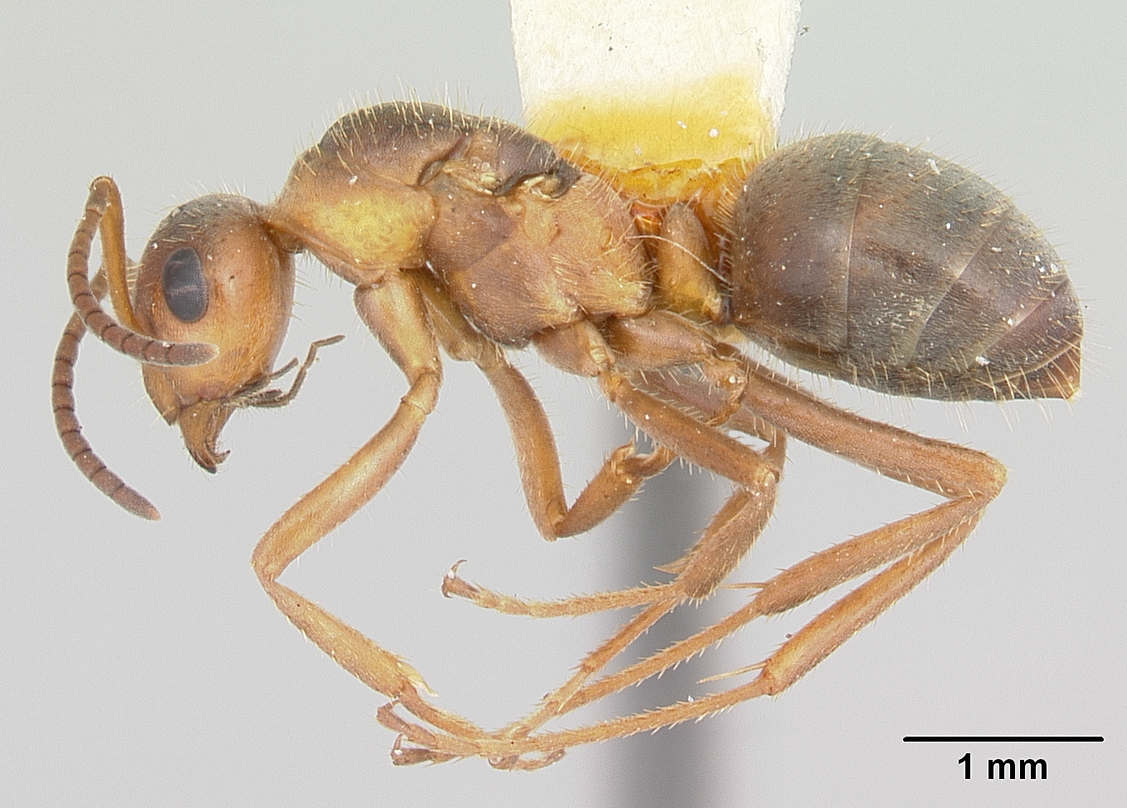
Formica dirksi worker

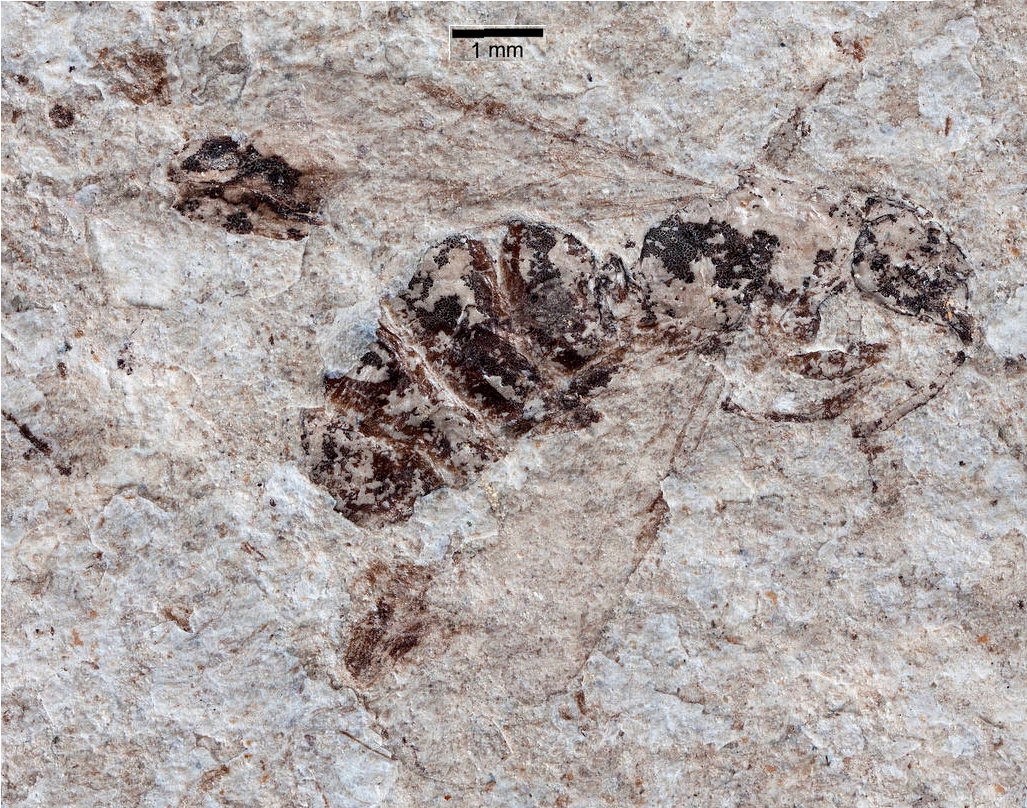
†Formica cockerelli paratype male

- Formica accreta Francoeur, 1973
- Formica adamsi Wheeler, 1909
- Formica adelungi Forel, 1904
- Formica aerata Francoeur, 1973
- Formica altayensis Xia & Zheng, 1997
- Formica altipetens Wheeler, 1913
- Formica anatolica Seifert & Schultz, 2009
- Formica aquilonia Yarrow, 1955
- Formica archboldi Smith, 1944
- Formica argentea Wheeler, 1912
- Formica aserva Forel, 1901
- Formica aseta Chang & He, 2002
- Formica aterrima Cresson, 1865
- Formica balcanina Petrov & Collingwood, 1993
- Formica biophilica Trager et al., 2007
- Formica bradleyi Wheeler, 1913
- Formica breviscapa Chang & He, 2002
- Formica browni Francoeur, 1973
- Formica bruni Kutter, 1967
- Formica brunneonitida Dlussky, 1964
- Formica calviceps Cole, 1954
- Formica canadensis Santschi, 1914
- Formica candida Smith, 1878
- Formica caucasicola Seifert & Schultz, 2021
- Formica ciliata Mayr, 1886
- Formica cinerea Mayr, 1853
- Formica cinereofusca Karavaiev, 1929
- Formica clara Forel, 1886
- Formica clarissima Emery, 1925
- Formica coloradensis Creighton, 1940
- Formica comata Wheeler, 1909
- Formica corsica Seifert, 2002
- Formica creightoni Buren, 1968
- Formica criniventris Wheeler, 1912
- Formica cunicularia Latreille, 1798
- Formica curiosa Creighton, 1935
- Formica dachaidanensis Chang & He, 2002
- Formica dakotensis Emery, 1893
- Formica densiventris Viereck, 1903
- Formica difficilis Emery, 1893
- Formica dirksi Wing, 1949
- Formica dolosa Buren, 1944
- Formica draven Fisher, 2025
- Formica dusmeti Emery, 1909
- Formica emeryi Wheeler, 1913
- Formica exsecta Nylander, 1846
- Formica exsectoides Forel, 1886
- Formica fennica Seifert, 2000
- Formica ferocula Wheeler, 1913
- Formica foreli Bondroit, 1918
- Formica foreliana Wheeler, 1913
- Formica forsslundi Lohmander, 1949
- Formica fossaceps Buren, 1942
- Formica francoeuri Bolton, 1995
- Formica frontalis Santschi, 1919
- Formica fukaii Wheeler, 1914
- Formica fusca Linnaeus, 1758
- Formica fuscocinerea Forel, 1874
- Formica gagates Latreille, 1798
- Formica gagatoides Ruzsky, 1904
- Formica georgica Seifert, 2002
- Formica gerardi Bondroit, 1917
- Formica glabridorsis Santschi, 1925
- Formica glacialis Wheeler, 1908
- Formica gnava Buckley, 1866
- Formica gravelyi Mukerjee, 1930
- Formica gynocrates Snelling & Buren, 1985
- Formica hayashi Terayama & Hashimoto, 1996
- Formica helvetica Seifert, 2021
- Formica hewitti Wheeler, 1917
- Formica impexa Wheeler, 1905
- Formica incerta Buren, 1944
- Formica indianensis Cole, 1940
- Formica integra Nylander, 1856
- Formica integroides Wheeler, 1913
- Formica japonica Motschoulsky, 1866
- Formica kashmirica Stärcke, 1935
- Formica knighti Buren, 1944
- Formica kozlovi Dlussky, 1965
- Formica kupyanskayae Bolton, 1995
- Formica laeviceps Creighton, 1940
- Formica lasioides Emery, 1893
- Formica lemani Bondroit, 1917
- Formica lepida Wheeler, 1913
- Formica limata Wheeler, 1913
- Formica liogaster Chang & He, 2002
- Formica liopthalma Chang & He, 2002
- Formica litoralis Kuznetsov-Ugamsky, 1926
- Formica longiceps Dlussky, 1964
- Formica longipilosa Francoeur, 1973
- Formica lugubris Zetterstedt, 1838
- Formica manchu Wheeler, 1929
- Formica manni Wheeler, 1913
- Formica maura Santschi, 1929
- Formica mesasiatica Dlussky, 1964
- Formica microgyna Wheeler, 1903
- Formica microphthalma Francoeur, 1973
- Formica miniocca Chang & He, 2002
- Formica moki Wheeler, 1906
- Formica montana Wheeler, 1910
- Formica morsei Wheeler, 1906
- Formica mucescens Wheeler, 1913
- Formica mutinensis (Canestrini, 1873)
- Formica mytara Fisher, 2025
- Formica neoclara Emery, 1893
- Formica neogagates Viereck, 1903
- Formica neorufibarbis Emery, 1893
- Formica nepticula Wheeler, 1905
- Formica nevadensis Wheeler, 1904
- Formica obscuripes Forel, 1886
- Formica obscuriventris Mayr, 1870
- Formica obsidiana Emery, 1923
- Formica obtusopilosa Emery, 1893
- Formica occulta Francoeur, 1973
- Formica opaciventris Emery, 1893
- Formica orangea Seifert & Schultz, 2009
- Formica oreas Wheeler, 1903
- Formica oregonensis Cole, 1938
- Formica pachucana Francoeur, 1973
- Formica pacifica Francoeur, 1973
- Formica pallidefulva Latreille, 1802
- Formica pamirica Dlussky, 1965
- Formica paralugubris Seifert, 1996
- Formica pergandei Emery, 1893
- Formica perpilosa Wheeler, 1913
- Formica persica Seifert & Schultz, 2009
- Formica picea Nylander, 1846
- Formica pisarskii Dlussky, 1964
- Formica planipilis Creighton, 1940
- Formica podzolica Francoeur, 1973
- Formica polyctena Foerster, 1850
- Formica postoculata Kennedy & Dennis, 1937
- Formica pratensis Retzius, 1783
- Formica pressilabris Nylander, 1846
- Formica prociliata Kennedy & Dennis, 1937
- Formica propatula Francoeur, 1973
- Formica propinqua Creighton, 1940
- Formica puberula Emery, 1893
- Formica pulla Francoeur, 1973
- Formica pyrenaea Bondroit, 1918
- Formica querquetulana Kennedy & Davis, 1937
- Formica ravida Creighton, 1940
- Formica reflexa Buren, 1942
- Formica retecta Francoeur, 1973
- Formica rubicunda Emery, 1893
- Formica rufa Linnaeus, 1761 (Type species)
- Formica rufibarbis Fabricius, 1793
- Formica rufolucida Collingwood, 1962
- Formica sanguinea Latreille, 1798
- Formica scitula Wheeler, 1913
- Formica selysi Bondroit, 1918
- Formica sentschuensis Ruzsky, 1915
- Formica sibylla Wheeler, 1913
- Formica sinensis Wheeler, 1913
- Formica spatulata Buren, 1944
- Formica subaenescens Emery, 1893
- Formica subcyanea Wheeler, 1913
- Formica subelongata Francoeur, 1973
- Formica subintegra Wheeler, 1908
- Formica subnitens Creighton, 1940
- Formica subpilosa Ruzsky, 1902
- Formica subpolita Mayr, 1886
- Formica subsericea Say, 1836
- Formica suecica Adlerz, 1902
- Formica talbotae Wilson, 1977
- Formica tarimica Seifert & Schultz, 2009
- Formica tianshanica Seifert & Schultz, 2009
- Formica tibetana Schultz & Seifert, 2025
- Formica tombeuri Bondroit, 1917
- Formica torrentium Bernard, 1967
- Formica transmontanis Francoeur, 1973
- Formica truncorum Fabricius, 1804
- Formica ulkei Emery, 1893
- Formica uralensis Ruzsky, 1895
- Formica ussuriensis Seifert, 2021
- Formica villiscapa Chang & He, 2002
- Formica vinculans Wheeler, 1913
- Formica wheeleri Creighton, 1935
- Formica xerophila Smith, 1939
- Formica yessensis Wheeler, 1913
- Formica yoshiokae Wheeler, 1933

== Extinct ==
- †Formica alsatica Theobald, 1937
- †Formica annosa LaPolla & Greenwalt, 2015
- †Formica arcana Scudder, 1877
- †Formica auxillacensis Piton, 1935
- †Formica bauckhorni Meunier, 1915
- †Formica biamoensis Dlussky et al., 2015
- †Formica buphthalma Novak, 1878
- †Formica cantalica Piton, 1935
- †Formica ceps Zhang, 1989
- †Formica cockerelli Carpenter, 1930
- †Formica eoptera Cockerell, 1923
- †Formica flavifemoralis Zhang et al., 1994
- †Formica flori Mayr, 1868
- †Formica grandis Carpenter, 1930
- †Formica gustawi Dlussky, 2002
- †Formica heteroptera Cockerell, 1920
- †Formica horrida Wheeler, 1915
- †Formica kutscheri Dlussky, 2008
- †Formica latinodosa Theobald, 1937
- †Formica linquensis Zhang, 1989
- †Formica maculipennis Theobald, 1935
- †Formica martynovi Popov, 1933
- †Formica obscura Heer, 1849
- †Formica ovala Zhang, 1989
- †Formica palaeopolonica Dlussky, 2008
- †Formica paleosibirica Dlussky et al., 2015
- †Formica parexsecta Dlussky & Putyatina, 2014
- †Formica phaethusa Wheeler, 1915
- †Formica pitoni Theobald, 1935
- †Formica radchenkoi Dlussky, 2008
- †Formica ribbeckei Radchenko & Perkovsky, 2021
- †Formica robusta Carpenter, 1930
- †Formica sepulta Theobald, 1937
- †Formica serresi Theobald, 1937
- †Formica seuberti Heer, 1849
- †Formica strangulata Wheeler, 1915
- †Formica surinamensis Berendt, 1830
- †Formica tripartita Theobald, 1937
- †Formica ungeri Heer, 1849
- †Formica zherikhini Dlussky, 2008

== Unidentifiable ==
A number of species tentatively placed within the genus have subsequently been determined as unidentifiable to the species level due to various reasons like loss of or extensive damage to the type specimen, a description deemed too vague to identify to the species level, or often both simultaneously, although they technically remain valid binomen.

- Formica abdominalis Latreille, 1802
- Formica aegyptiaca Fabricius, 1775
- Formica amyoti Le Guillou, 1842
- Formica aequalis Walker, 1871
- Formica affinis Leach, 1825
- Formica albipennis Fabricius, 1793
- Formica arenicola Buckley, 1866
- Formica atra Schilling, 1839
- Formica bicolor Leach, 1825
- Formica chufejif Forskal, 1775
- Formica conica Fabricius, 1798
- Formica connecticutensis Buckley, 1866
- †Formica demersa Heer, 1849
- Formica didyma Fabricius, 1782
- Formica dislocata Say, 1836
- Formica elevata Fabricius, 1782
- Formica elongata Fabricius, 1787
- Formica fatale Christ, 1791
- Formica foetens Olivier, 1792
- †Formica fragilis Heer, 1867
- Formica fuscescens Gmelin, 1790
- Formica fuscicauda Motschoulsky, 1863
- †Formica gibbosa Presl, 1822
- Formica glabra Gmelin, 1790
- Formica glauca Ruzsky, 1896
- †Formica globiventris Heer, 1849
- †Formica gravida Heer, 1849
- Formica hirta Gravenhorst, 1807
- †Formica immersa Heer, 1849
- Formica incisa Smith, 1858
- Formica inequalis Lowne, 1865
- Formica insultans Forskal, 1775
- †Formica lavateri Heer, 1849
- Formica lincecumii Buckley, 1866
- †Formica longicollis Heer, 1849
- †Formica lucida Giebel, 1856
- Formica lutea Dumeril, 1860
- †Formica luteola Presl, 1822
- †Formica macrognatha Presl, 1822
- †Formica macrophthalma Heer, 1849
- Formica maculata Geoffroy, 1785
- Formica malabarica Schrank, 1837
- Formica maligna Forskal, 1775
- Formica maxillosa Fabricius, 1775
- Formica melanophthalma Reich, 1793
- Formica melanopis Gmelin, 1790
- Formica minuta Lowne, 1865
- Formica molestans Latreille, 1802
- Formica nana Latreille, 1802
- †Formica nigra Presl, 1822
- Formica nitida Razoumowsky, 1789
- Formica nortonii Buckley, 1866
- Formica novaeanglae Buckley, 1866
- Formica obsoleta Linnaeus, 1758
- †Formica obtecta Heer, 1849
- †Formica obvoluta Heer, 1849
- Formica occidentalis Buckley, 1866
- †Formica oculata Heer, 1849
- Formica omnivora Linnaeus, 1758
- †Formica orbata Heer, 1849
- Formica ovata Reich, 1793
- Formica pallidelutea Latreille, 1802
- Formica pallipes Latreille, 1787
- †Formica parvula Presl, 1822
- Formica phyllophila Jerdon, 1851
- Formica picipes Reich, 1793
- Formica politurata Buckley, 1866
- †Formica primitiva Heer, 1849
- †Formica primordialis Heer, 1849
- †Formica procera Heer, 1849
- †Formica pulchella Heer, 1850
- †Formica quadrata Holl, 1829
- Formica quadrinotata Losana, 1834
- Formica rediana Leach, 1825
- Formica rostrata Fabricius, 1787
- Formica rubescens Leach, 1825
- Formica ruficeps Motschoulsky, 1863
- Formica ruficornis Gmelin, 1790
- Formica rupestris Leach, 1825
- Formica saccharivora Linnaeus, 1758
- Formica saxicola Buckley, 1866
- Formica schardj Forskal, 1775
- Formica siamicarubra Christ, 1791
- Formica subpicea Motschoulsky, 1863
- Formica subspinosa Buckley, 1866
- Formica tenuissima Buckley, 1866
- Formica testacea Gmelin, 1790
- Formica testaceipes Leach, 1825
- Formica thoracica Olivier, 1792
- Formica tomentosa Reich, 1793
- Formica triangularis Say, 1836
- †Formica trigona Presl, 1822
- Formica vagans Fabricius, 1793
- Formica venosa Gmelin, 1790
- Formica virginiana Buckley, 1866

== Unavailable ==
One species, Formica fuliginothorax, is unavailable due to the type description not designating any type specimens.

- Formica fuliginothorax Blacker, 1992
