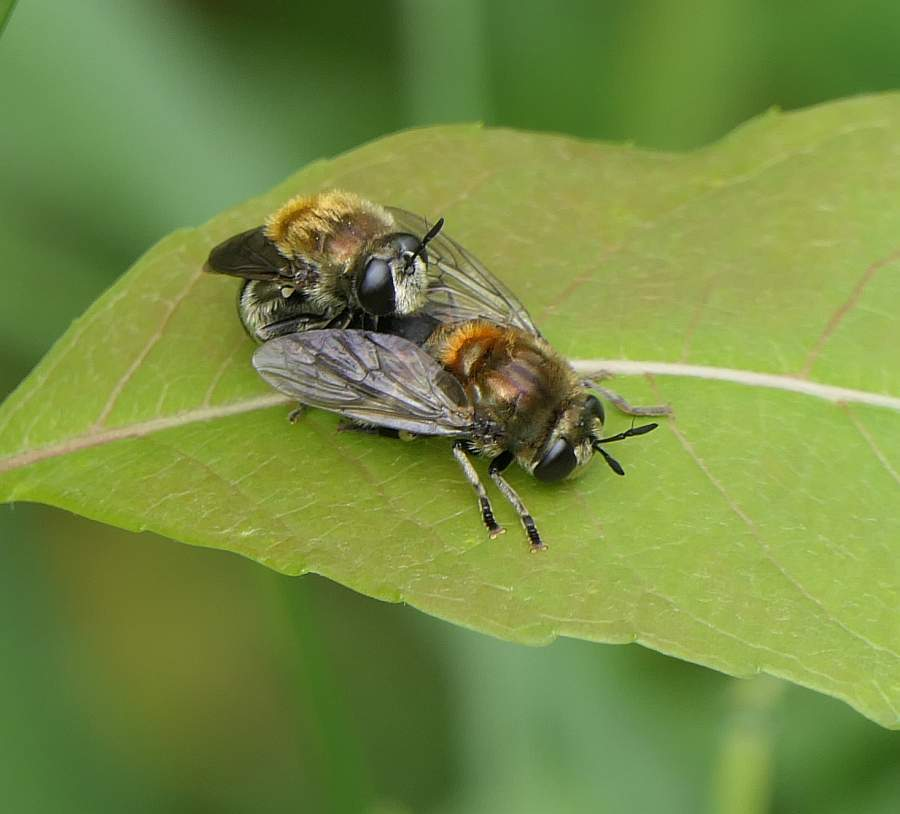
- Microdon manitobensis

Scientific classification
- Kingdom: Animalia
- Phylum: Arthropoda
- Clade: Pancrustacea
- Class: Insecta
- Order: Diptera
- Family: Syrphidae
- Genus: Microdon (fly)
- Species: M. manitobensis

Binomial name
- Microdon manitobensis Curran, 1924

= Microdon manitobensis =

Species of fly

Microdon manitobensis, also commonly known as the Greater Ant Fly, is a species of hover fly that belongs to the family Syrphidae. They can be mainly found in the northern regions of North America in areas such as the United States (New England).

== Taxonomy ==
Microdon manitobensis was described by Charles Howard Curran, a Canadian entomologist specializing in the study of Diptera, in 1924. This species belongs to the family Syrphidae (Microdontinae), also commonly known as the hover flies. Within the genus Microdon, it is a member of the subgenus Microdon sensu stricto.

== Description ==
It is a robust species that grows to a length of 11-13 mm. The pilose located on the head and thorax are yellow and their hind basitarsi is not unusually swollen. Its eyes are bare.

== Ecology ==
They inhabit nests of Formica densiventris and Formica neoclara, both species of wood ants that belongs to the tribe Formicini. Their floral associations have not been recorded.
