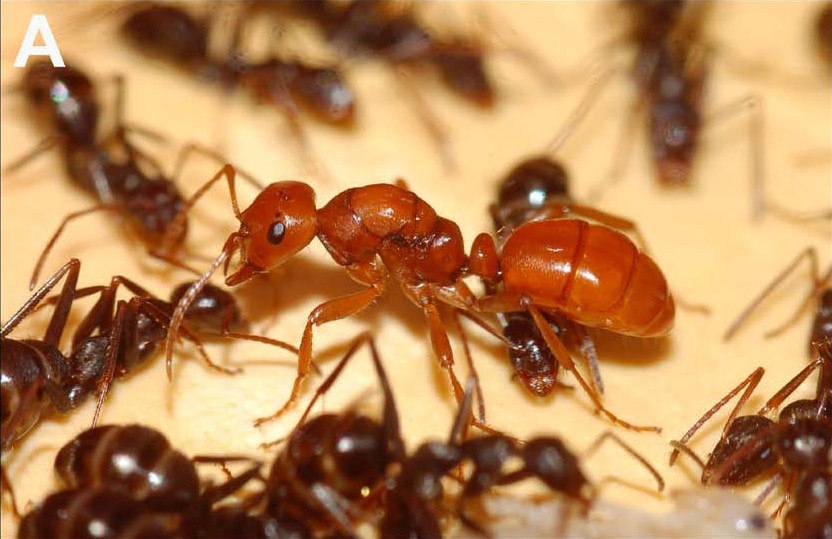
- F. archboldi are the darker-colored ants in this image, the reddish-orange one in the center is a Polyergus lucidus queen

Scientific classification
- Kingdom: Animalia
- Phylum: Arthropoda
- Clade: Pancrustacea
- Class: Insecta
- Order: Hymenoptera
- Family: Formicidae
- Subfamily: Formicinae
- Tribe: Formicini
- Genus: Formica
- Species: F. archboldi

Binomial name
- Formica archboldi Smith, 1944

= Formica archboldi =

Species of ant

Formica archboldi is a species of ant in the family Formicidae, with its common name being skull-collecting ant or headhunter ants. They are known for their unusual behavior, which includes the collection and storage of Odontomachus (trap-jaw) ant skulls.

Formica archboldi ants store these severed ant heads in their nests. Formica archboldi have odors that are chemically similar to the odors of the trap-jaw ants, which might allow Formica ants to disguise themselves among trap-jaw ants. Formica ants immobilize trap-jaw ants by spraying formic acid, then drag them into their nest, and dismember them.
