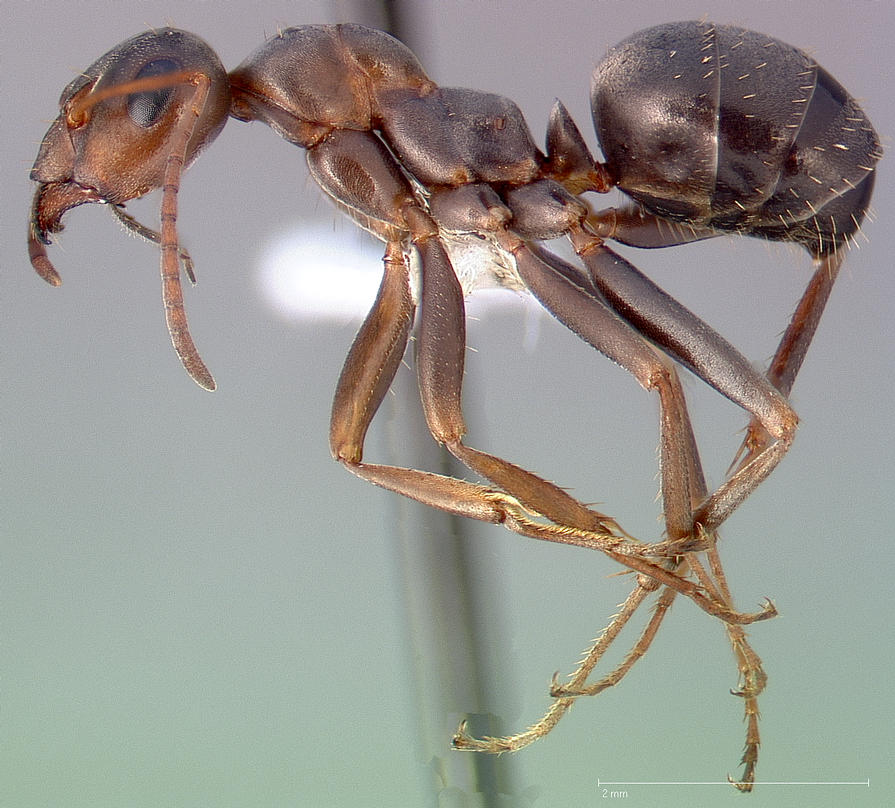

Scientific classification
- Domain: Eukaryota
- Kingdom: Animalia
- Phylum: Arthropoda
- Class: Insecta
- Order: Hymenoptera
- Family: Formicidae
- Subfamily: Formicinae
- Tribe: Formicini
- Genus: Formica
- Species: F. gnava

Binomial name
- Formica gnava Buckley, 1866

= Formica gnava =

Species of ant

Formica gnava is a species of ant in the family Formicidae.
