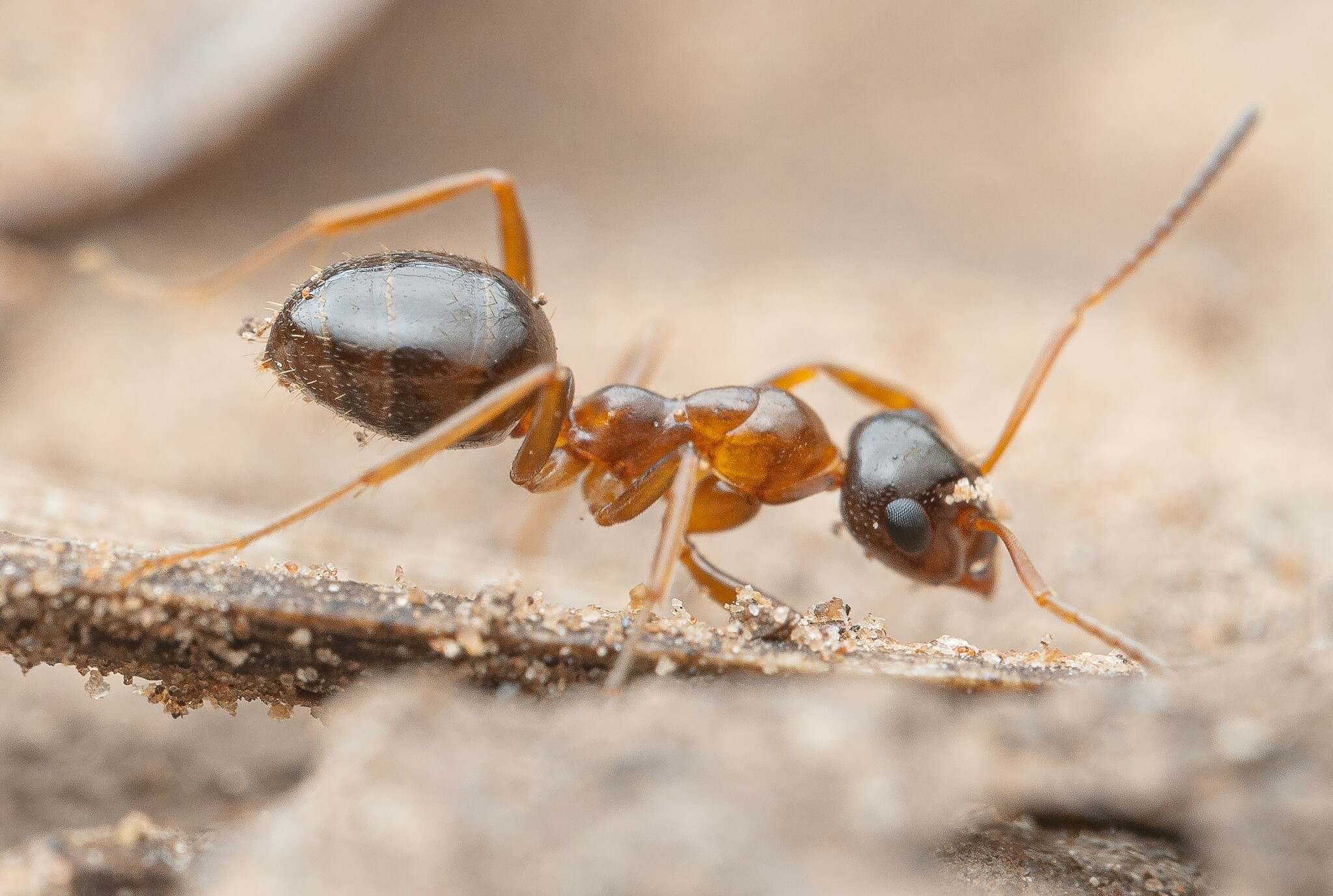

Scientific classification
- Kingdom: Animalia
- Phylum: Arthropoda
- Class: Insecta
- Order: Hymenoptera
- Family: Formicidae
- Subfamily: Formicinae
- Tribe: Formicini
- Genus: Formica
- Species: F. limata

Binomial name
- Formica limata Wheeler, 1913

= Formica limata =

Species of ant

Formica limata is a species of ant in the family Formicidae.
