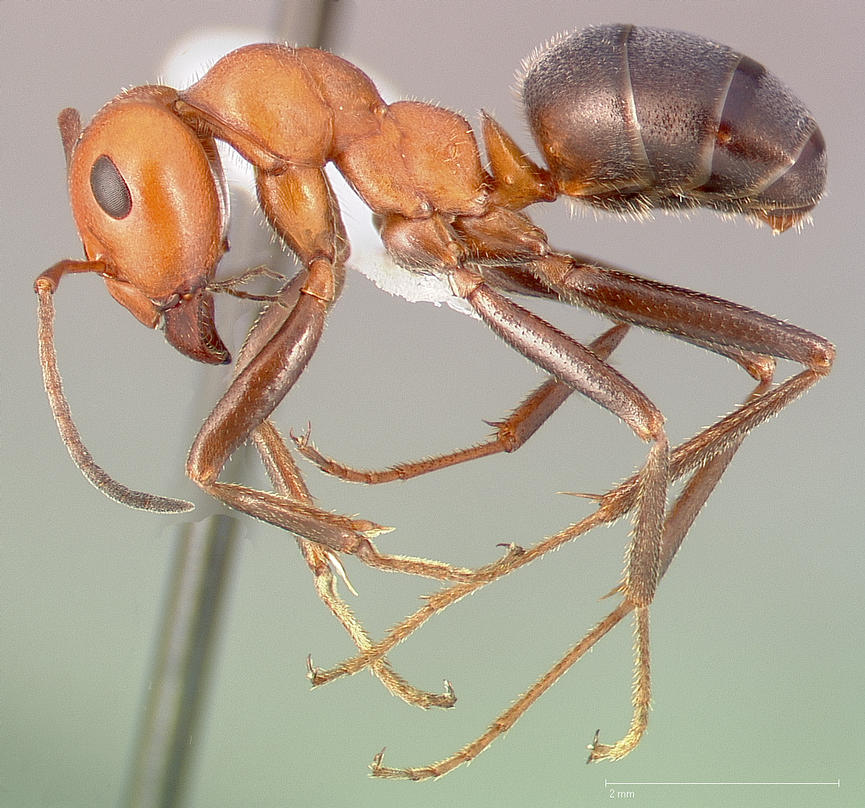

Scientific classification
- Domain: Eukaryota
- Kingdom: Animalia
- Phylum: Arthropoda
- Class: Insecta
- Order: Hymenoptera
- Family: Formicidae
- Subfamily: Formicinae
- Tribe: Formicini
- Genus: Formica
- Species: F. oreas

Binomial name
- Formica oreas Wheeler, 1903

= Formica oreas =

Species of ant

Formica oreas is a species of ant in the family Formicidae.

== Subspecies ==
These two subspecies belong to the species Formica oreas:

- Formica oreas comptula Wheeler, 1913
- Formica oreas oreas Wheeler, 1903
