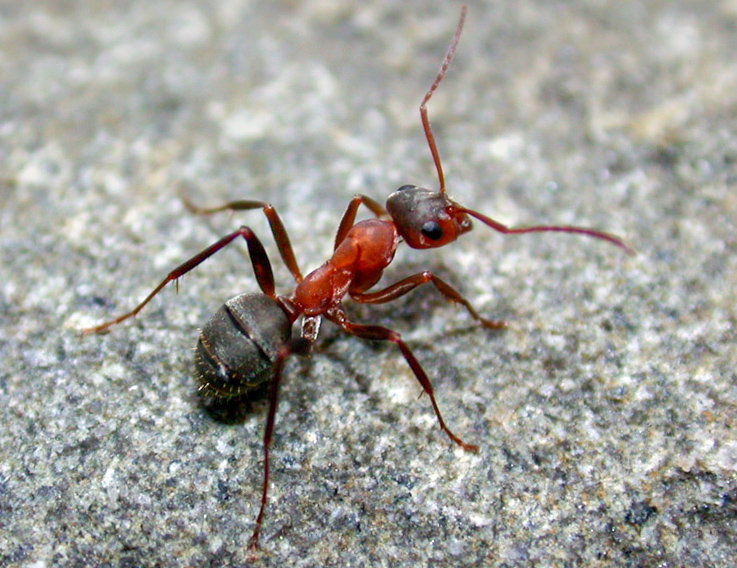

Scientific classification
- Domain: Eukaryota
- Kingdom: Animalia
- Phylum: Arthropoda
- Class: Insecta
- Order: Hymenoptera
- Family: Formicidae
- Subfamily: Formicinae
- Tribe: Formicini
- Genus: Formica
- Species: F. moki

Binomial name
- Formica moki Wheeler, 1906

= Formica moki =

Species of ant

Formica moki is a species of ant in the family Formicidae.
