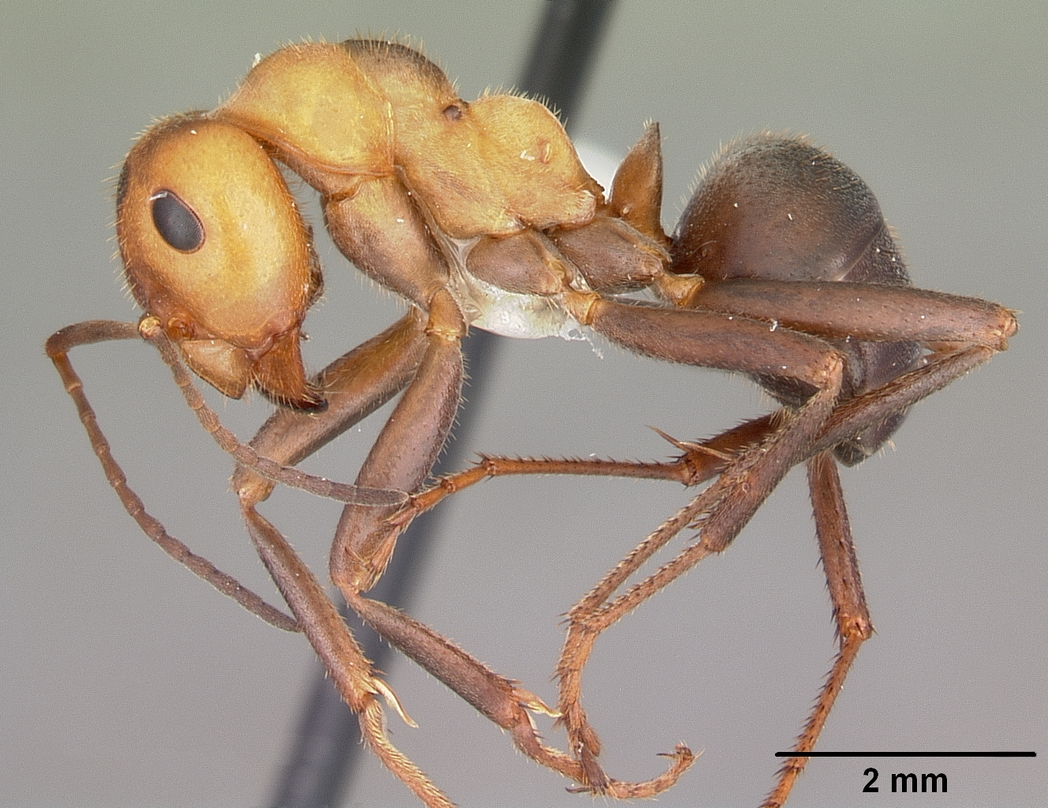

Scientific classification
- Domain: Eukaryota
- Kingdom: Animalia
- Phylum: Arthropoda
- Class: Insecta
- Order: Hymenoptera
- Family: Formicidae
- Subfamily: Formicinae
- Tribe: Formicini
- Genus: Formica
- Species: F. obscuriventris

Binomial name
- Formica obscuriventris Mayr, 1870

= Formica obscuriventris =

Species of ant

Formica obscuriventris is a species of ant in the family Formicidae.

== Subspecies ==
These two subspecies belong to the species Formica obscuriventris:

- Formica obscuriventris clivia Creighton, 1940^{i c g}
- Formica obscuriventris obscuriventris Mayr, 1870^{i c g}

Data sources: i = ITIS, c = Catalogue of Life, g = GBIF, b = Bugguide.net
