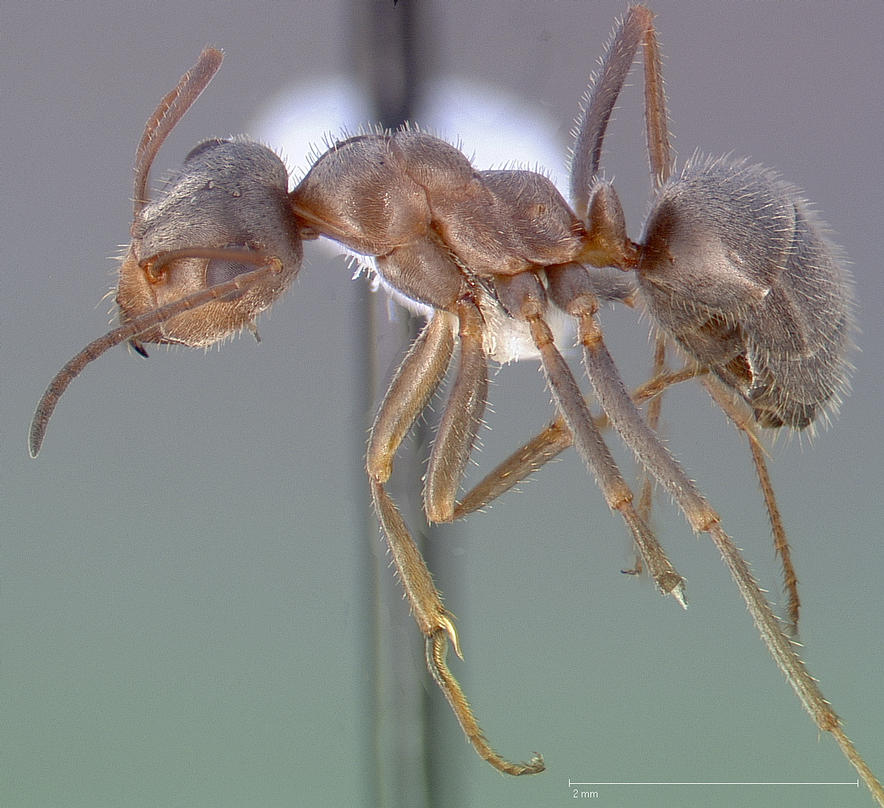

Scientific classification
- Domain: Eukaryota
- Kingdom: Animalia
- Phylum: Arthropoda
- Class: Insecta
- Order: Hymenoptera
- Family: Formicidae
- Subfamily: Formicinae
- Tribe: Formicini
- Genus: Formica
- Species: F. francoeuri

Binomial name
- Formica francoeuri Bolton, 1995

= Formica francoeuri =

Species of ant

Formica francoeuri is a species of ant in the family Formicidae.
