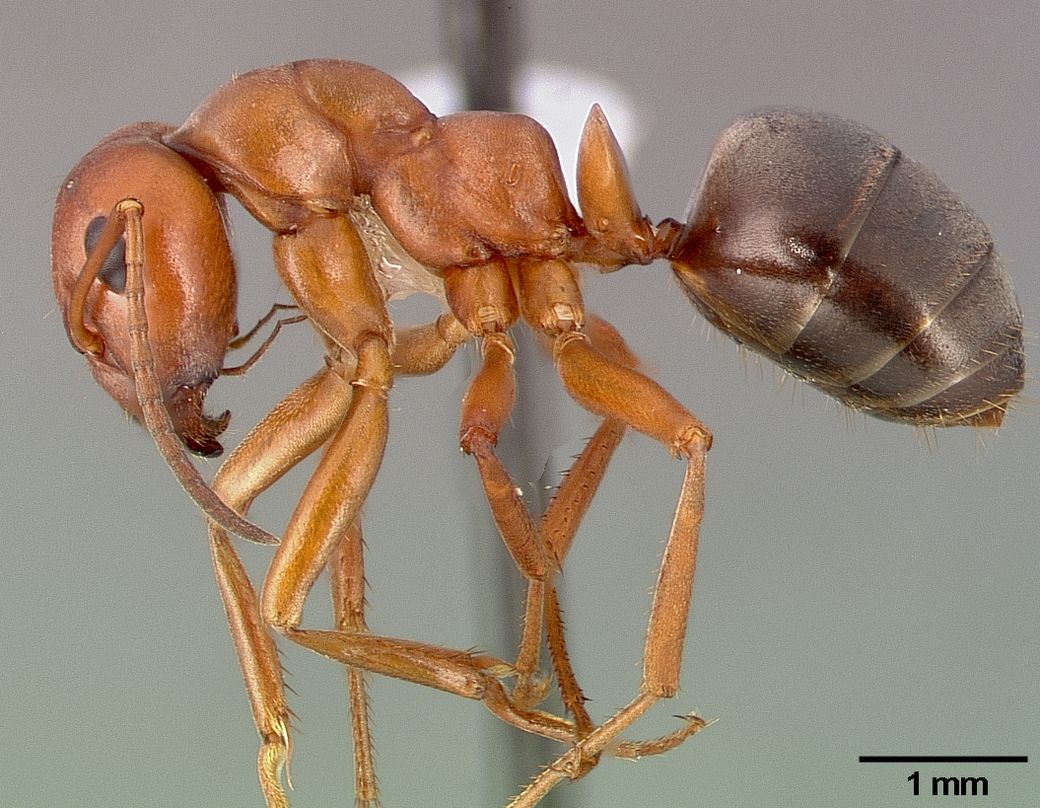

Scientific classification
- Kingdom: Animalia
- Phylum: Arthropoda
- Clade: Pancrustacea
- Class: Insecta
- Order: Hymenoptera
- Family: Formicidae
- Subfamily: Formicinae
- Tribe: Formicini
- Genus: Formica
- Species: F. aserva

Binomial name
- Formica aserva Forel, 1901

= Formica aserva =

Species of ant

Formica aserva is a species of ant in the family Formicidae. The species is a social parasite of other Formica species.
