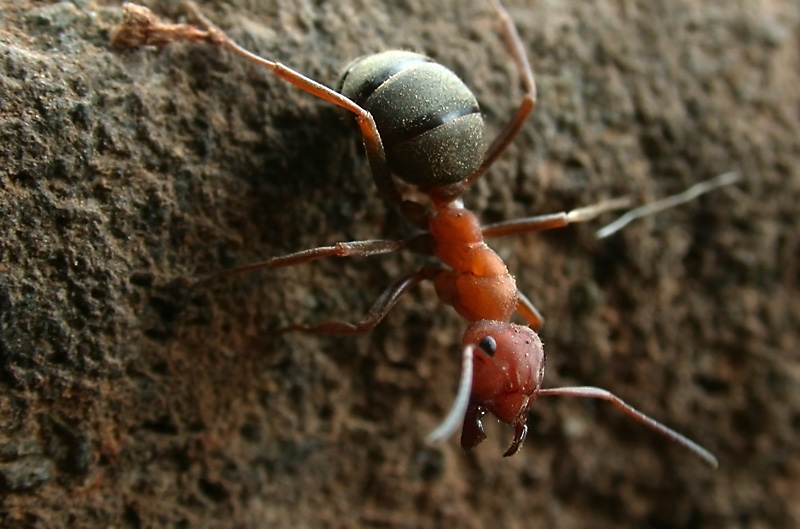

Scientific classification
- Domain: Eukaryota
- Kingdom: Animalia
- Phylum: Arthropoda
- Class: Insecta
- Order: Hymenoptera
- Family: Formicidae
- Subfamily: Formicinae
- Tribe: Formicini
- Genus: Formica
- Species: F. integroides

Binomial name
- Formica integroides Wheeler, 1913

= Formica integroides =

Species of ant

Formica integroides, also known as the Vinegar Ant, is a species of ant in the family Formicidae.
