= Formica subpicea =

Scientific classification
- Kingdom: Animalia
- Phylum: Arthropoda
- Clade: Pancrustacea
- Class: Insecta
- Order: Hymenoptera
- Family: Formicidae
- Subfamily: Formicinae
- Genus: Formica
- Species: F. subpicea

Binomial name
- Formica subpicea Motschoulsky, 1863

Species of ant

Formica subpicea is a species of ant found in Sri Lanka. As its type specimen has been lost, it is considered unidentifiable to genus and placed incertae sedis into Formica.
