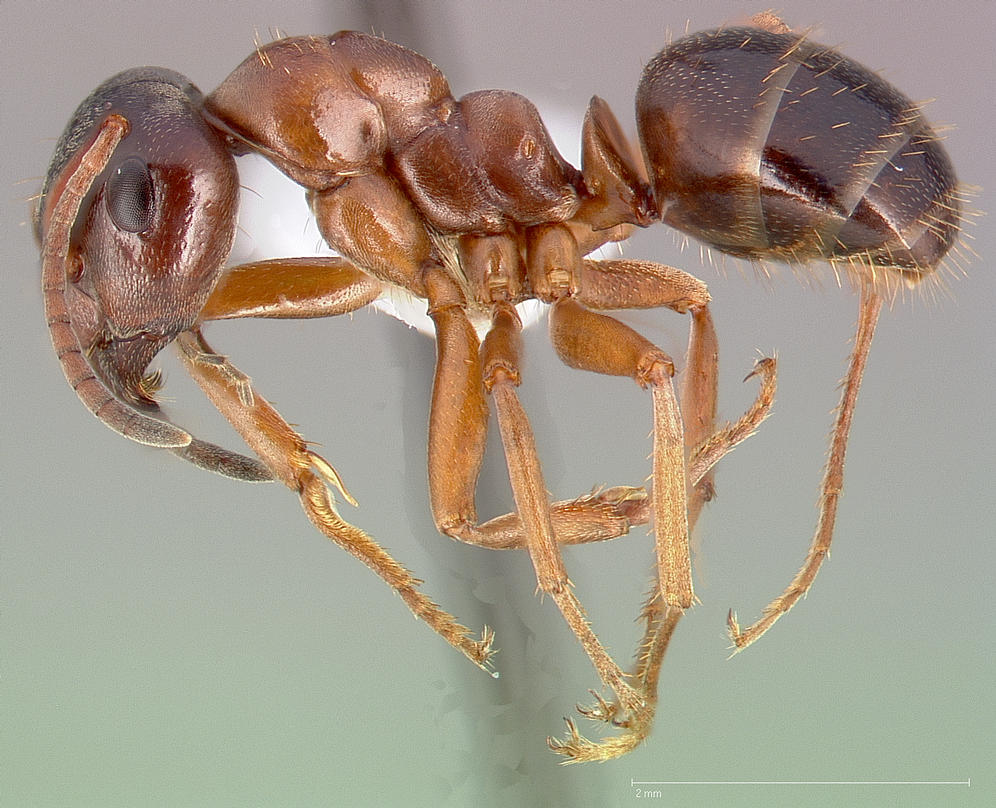

Scientific classification
- Domain: Eukaryota
- Kingdom: Animalia
- Phylum: Arthropoda
- Class: Insecta
- Order: Hymenoptera
- Family: Formicidae
- Subfamily: Formicinae
- Genus: Formica
- Species: F. subpolita

Binomial name
- Formica subpolita Mayr, 1886

= Formica subpolita =

Species of ant

Formica subpolita is a species of ant in the family Formicidae.
