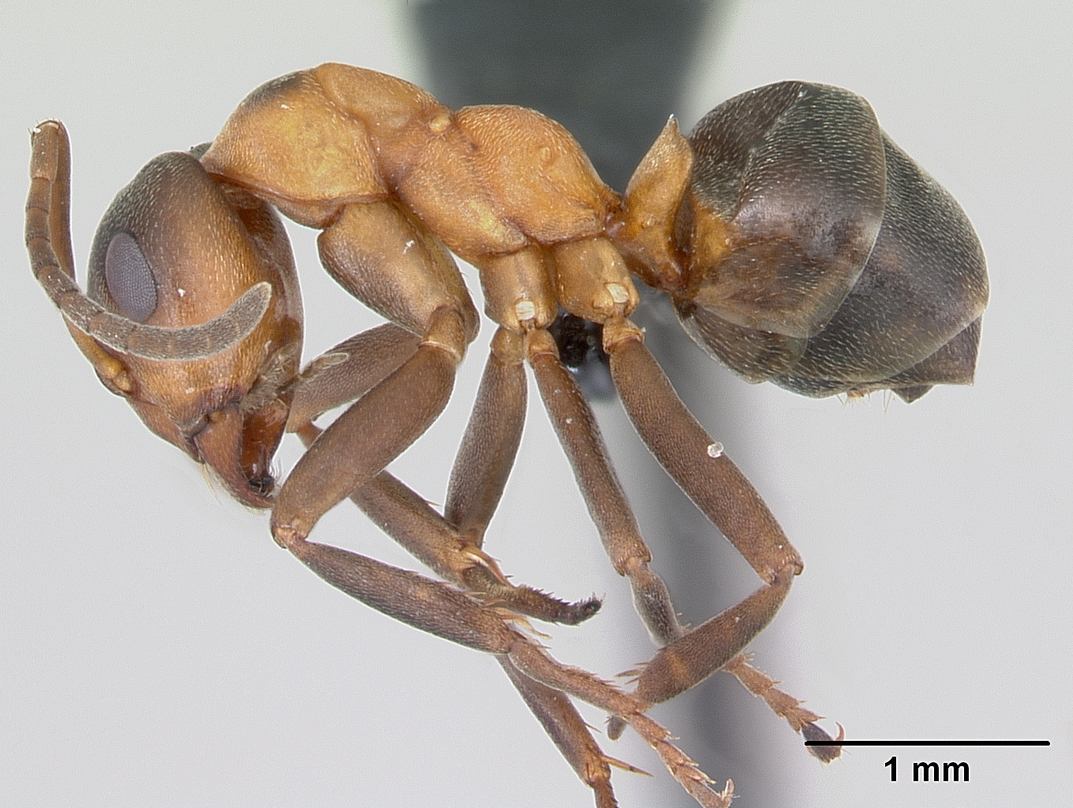

Scientific classification
- Kingdom: Animalia
- Phylum: Arthropoda
- Clade: Pancrustacea
- Class: Insecta
- Order: Hymenoptera
- Family: Formicidae
- Subfamily: Formicinae
- Genus: Formica
- Species: F. foreli

Binomial name
- Formica foreli Bondroit, 1918

= Formica foreli =

Species of insect

Formica foreli is a species of ant belonging to the family Formicidae.

It is native to Europe.
