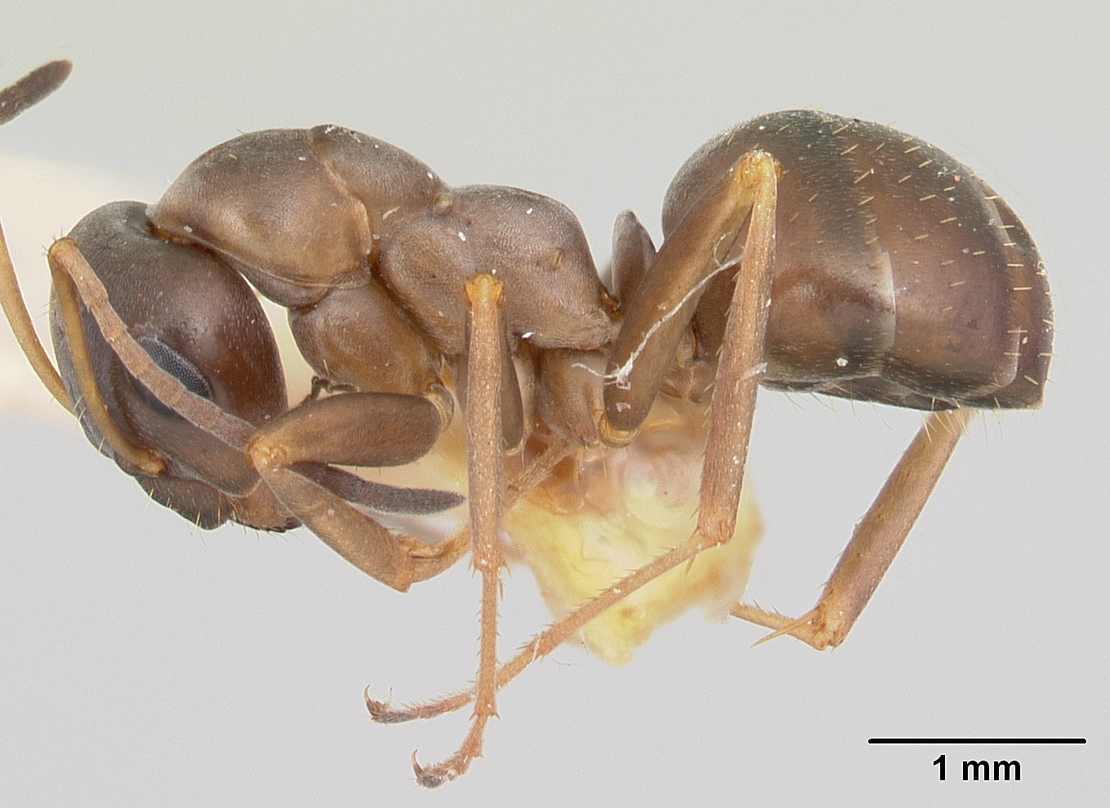
- Formica dirksi worker

Conservation status
- Vulnerable (IUCN 2.3)

Scientific classification
- Kingdom: Animalia
- Phylum: Arthropoda
- Class: Insecta
- Order: Hymenoptera
- Family: Formicidae
- Subfamily: Formicinae
- Genus: Formica
- Species: F. dirksi

Binomial name
- Formica dirksi Wing, 1949

= Formica dirksi =

Species of ant

Formica dirksi is a species of ant in the genus Formica. It is native to the United States.
