= Formica suecica =

Scientific classification
- Domain: Eukaryota
- Kingdom: Animalia
- Phylum: Arthropoda
- Class: Insecta
- Order: Hymenoptera
- Family: Formicidae
- Subfamily: Formicinae
- Genus: Formica
- Species: F. suecica

Binomial name
- Formica suecica Adlerz, 1902

Species of insect

Formica suecica is a species of ant belonging to the family Formicidae.

It is native to Northern Europe.
