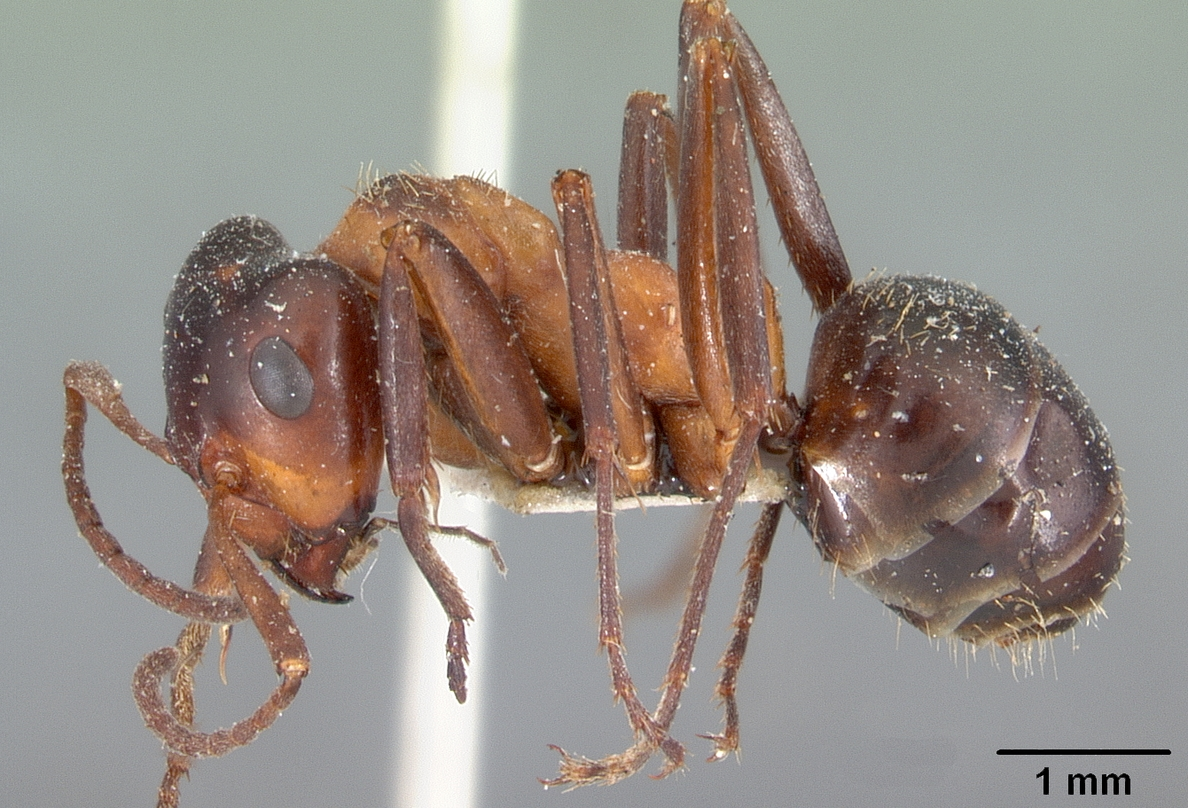

Scientific classification
- Domain: Eukaryota
- Kingdom: Animalia
- Phylum: Arthropoda
- Class: Insecta
- Order: Hymenoptera
- Family: Formicidae
- Subfamily: Formicinae
- Genus: Formica
- Species: F. ulkei

Binomial name
- Formica ulkei Emery, 1893

= Formica ulkei =

Species of ant

Formica ulkei is a species of ant in the family Formicidae. Carlo Emery described the species in 1893, and named it after Titus Ulke, a mineralogist who collected ants and beetles while employed by a mining company in South Dakota. Ulke sent specimens to his father, Henry Ulke, who passed the ant samples to Theodore Pergande, who in turn sent them to Emery.
