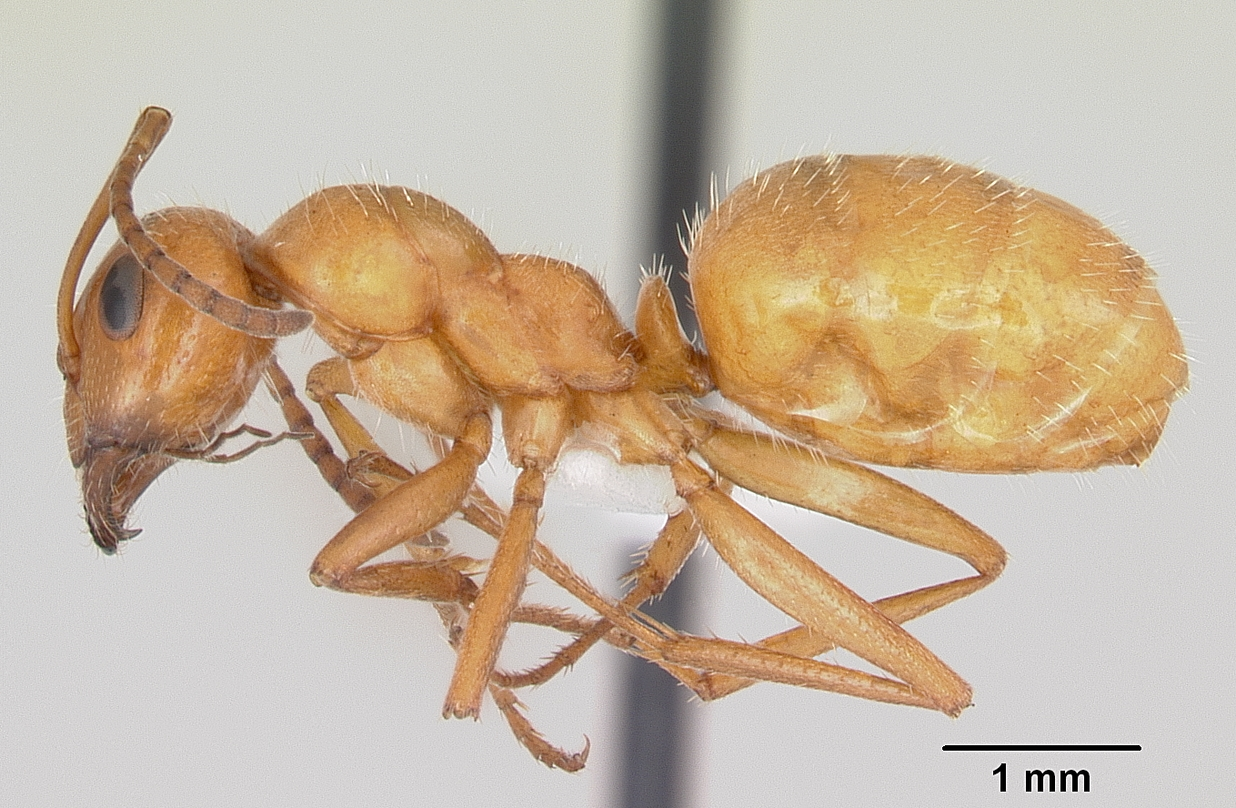
- worker

Scientific classification
- Domain: Eukaryota
- Kingdom: Animalia
- Phylum: Arthropoda
- Class: Insecta
- Order: Hymenoptera
- Family: Formicidae
- Subfamily: Formicinae
- Genus: Formica
- Species: F. bradleyi

Binomial name
- Formica bradleyi Wheeler, 1913

= Formica bradleyi =

Species of ant

Formica bradleyi (common name sandhill ant) is a species of ant. It is one of the few species that use only a single type of soil which is sandy soil. E. W. Wheeler first noticed its relationship with soil in 1944. An issue of the Journal of the Kansas Entomological Society states that the ant is "the most beautiful species of the genus, with its bright red females and workers, and its shining black males".
