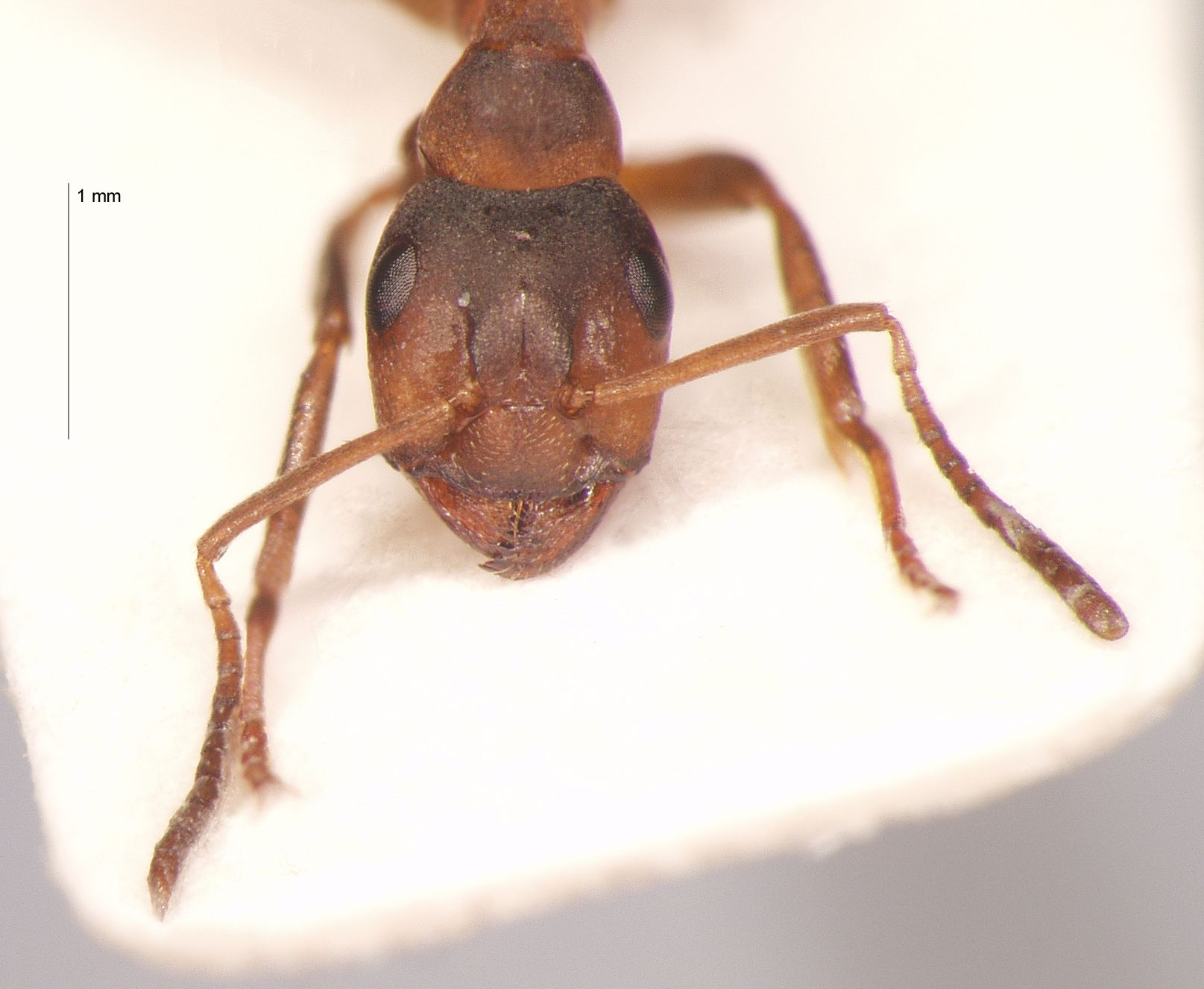

Scientific classification
- Kingdom: Animalia
- Phylum: Arthropoda
- Clade: Pancrustacea
- Class: Insecta
- Order: Hymenoptera
- Family: Formicidae
- Subfamily: Formicinae
- Genus: Formica
- Species: F. forsslundi

Binomial name
- Formica forsslundi Lohmander, 1949

= Formica forsslundi =

Species of insect

Formica forsslundi is a species of ant belonging to the family Formicidae.

It is native to Europe.
