= Formica fuscicauda =

Scientific classification
- Kingdom: Animalia
- Phylum: Arthropoda
- Clade: Pancrustacea
- Class: Insecta
- Order: Hymenoptera
- Family: Formicidae
- Subfamily: Formicinae
- Genus: Formica
- Species: F. fuscicauda

Binomial name
- Formica fuscicauda Forel, 1900

Species of ant

Formica fuscicauda is a species of ant of the subfamily Formicinae. It is found in Sri Lanka.
