= Formica gerardi =

Formica (Serviformica) gerardi

Scientific classification
- Domain: Eukaryota
- Kingdom: Animalia
- Phylum: Arthropoda
- Class: Insecta
- Order: Hymenoptera
- Family: Formicidae
- Subfamily: Formicinae
- Genus: Formica
- Species: F. gerardi

Binomial name
- Formica gerardi (Bondroit, 1917)

Species of ant

Formica gerardi is a species of ant that is one of two species of the subgenus Formica (Serviformica). The species is mainly distributed to mainland Europe. First described as Iberoformica gerardi in 1917 by Bondroit, it is now considered to be within Formica.

== Distribution ==
The species is primarily distributed within mainland Europe, commonly observed within the Iberian Peninsula.
