= Formica bruni =

Scientific classification
- Domain: Eukaryota
- Kingdom: Animalia
- Phylum: Arthropoda
- Class: Insecta
- Order: Hymenoptera
- Family: Formicidae
- Subfamily: Formicinae
- Genus: Formica
- Species: F. bruni

Binomial name
- Formica bruni Kutter, 1967

Species of insect

Formica bruni is a species of ant belonging to the family Formicidae.

It is native to Europe.
