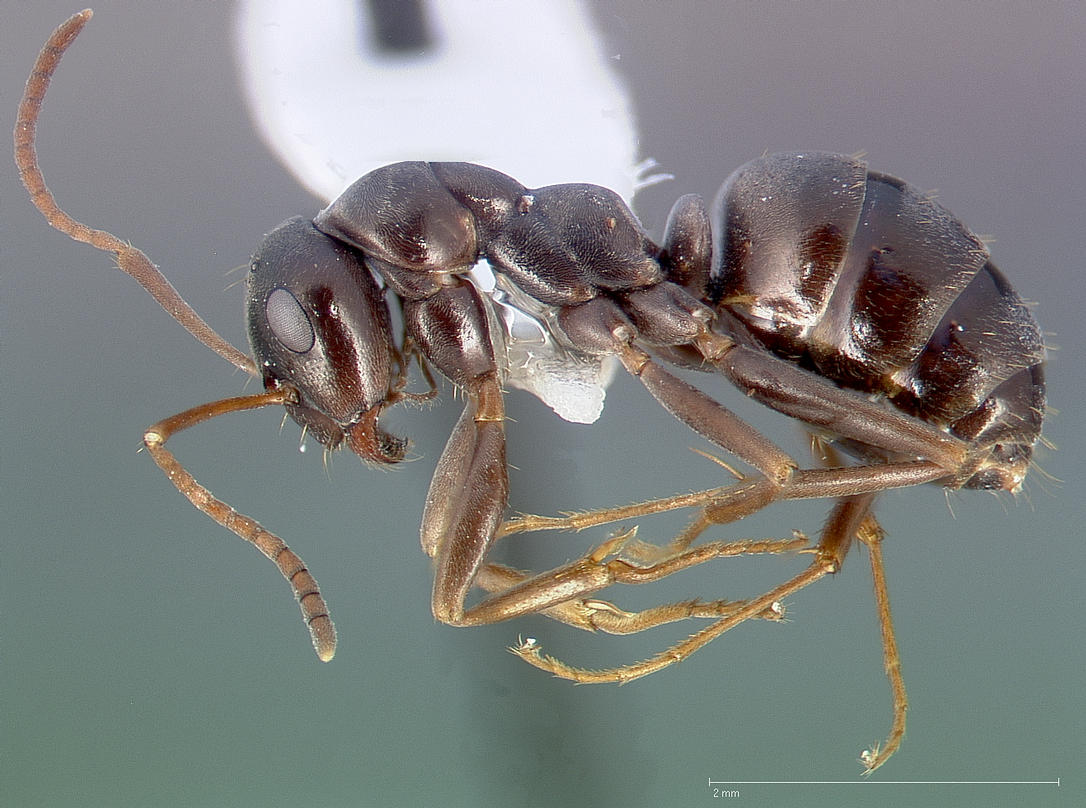

Scientific classification
- Kingdom: Animalia
- Phylum: Arthropoda
- Class: Insecta
- Order: Hymenoptera
- Family: Formicidae
- Subfamily: Formicinae
- Genus: Formica
- Species: F. microphthalma

Binomial name
- Formica microphthalma Francoeur, 1973

= Formica microphthalma =

Species of ant

Formica microphthalma is a species of ant in the family Formicidae.
