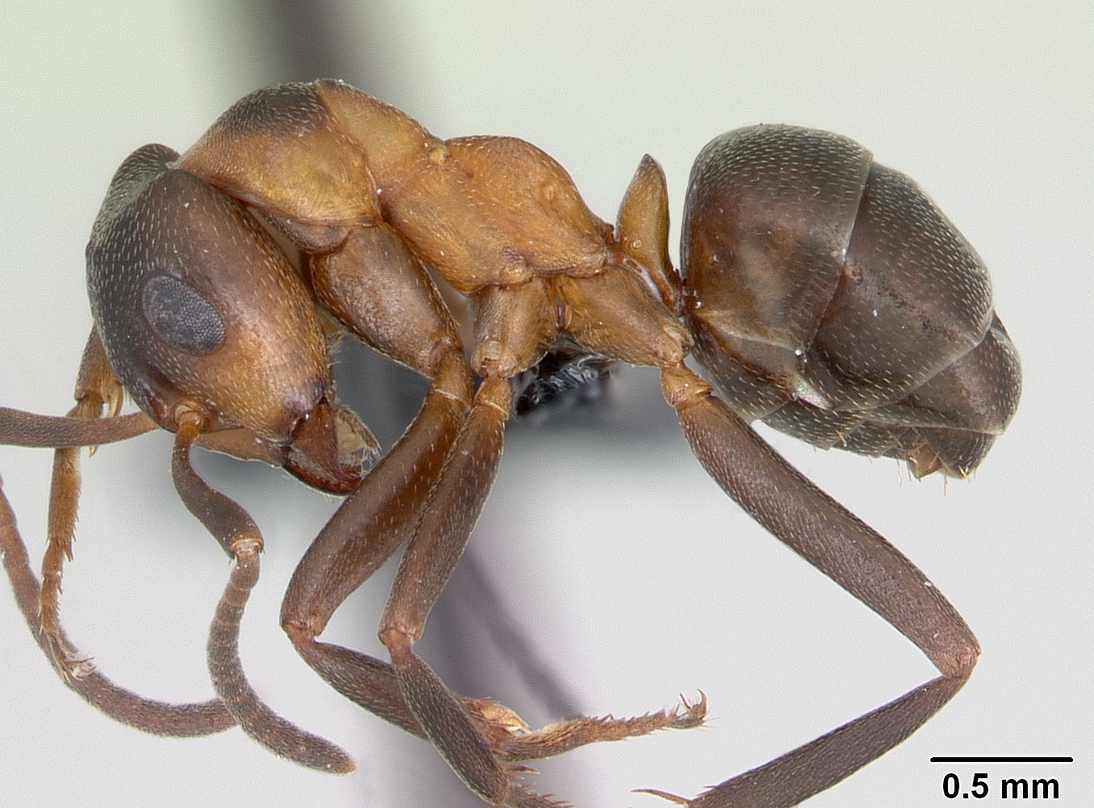

Scientific classification
- Domain: Eukaryota
- Kingdom: Animalia
- Phylum: Arthropoda
- Class: Insecta
- Order: Hymenoptera
- Family: Formicidae
- Subfamily: Formicinae
- Genus: Formica
- Species: F. pressilabris

Binomial name
- Formica pressilabris Nylander, 1846

= Formica pressilabris =

Species of insect

Formica pressilabris is a species of ant belonging to the family Formicidae.

It is native to Europe.
