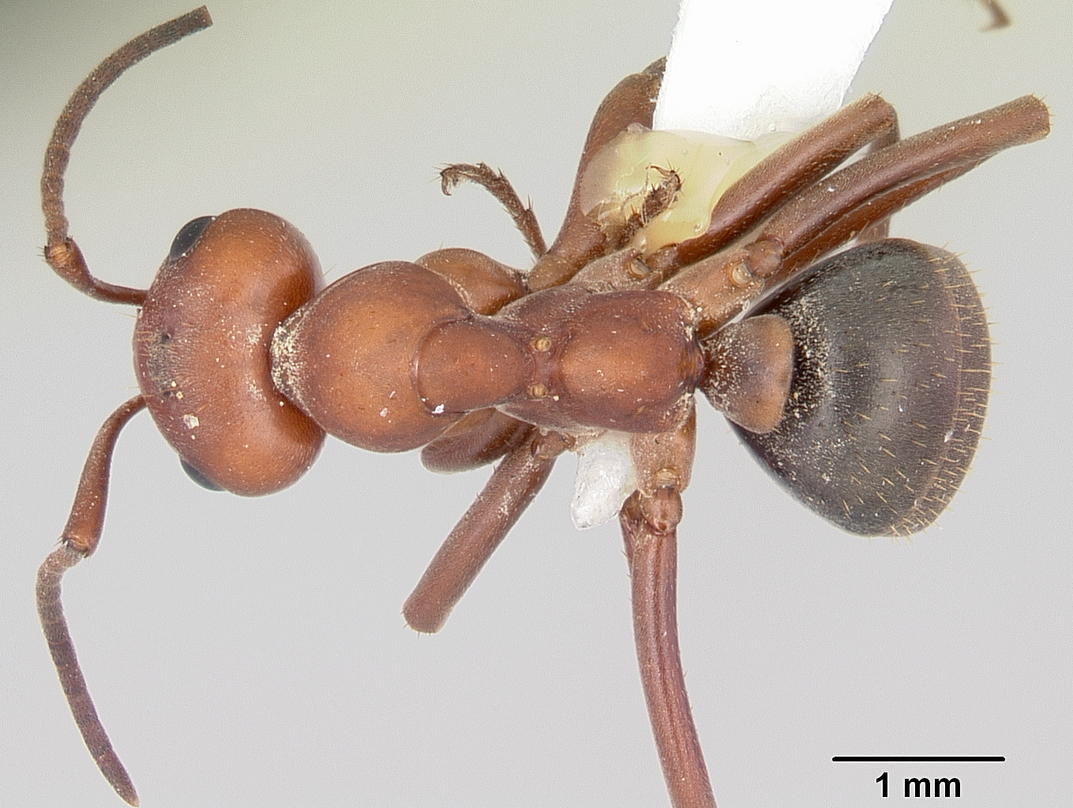

Scientific classification
- Domain: Eukaryota
- Kingdom: Animalia
- Phylum: Arthropoda
- Class: Insecta
- Order: Hymenoptera
- Family: Formicidae
- Subfamily: Formicinae
- Genus: Formica
- Species: F. rubicunda

Binomial name
- Formica rubicunda Emery, 1893

= Formica rubicunda =

Species of ant

Formica rubicunda is a species of ant in the family Formicidae.
