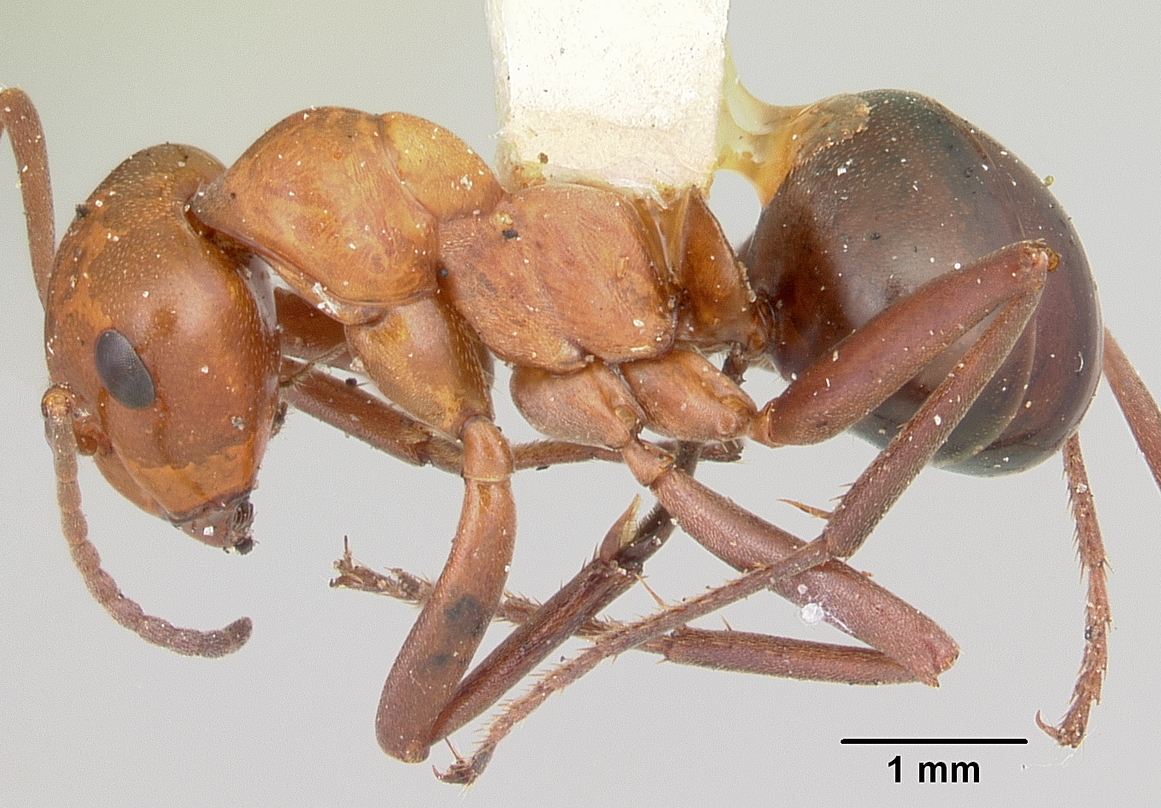
- Formica fossaceps

Scientific classification
- Domain: Eukaryota
- Kingdom: Animalia
- Phylum: Arthropoda
- Class: Insecta
- Order: Hymenoptera
- Family: Formicidae
- Subfamily: Formicinae
- Genus: Formica
- Species: F. fossaceps

Binomial name
- Formica fossaceps Buren, 1942

= Formica fossaceps =

Species of ant

Formica fossaceps is a species of ant in the genus Formica (wood ants, mound ants, and field ants), in the family Formicidae. This species is a member of the Formica rufa species group.
