= Formica nana =

The binomial name Formica nana may refer to any of three distinct species currently or formerly placed within the ant genus Formica.

- Formica nana Latreille, 1802, an unidentifiable species (Note: Due to various reasons like loss of or extensive damage to the type specimen, a description deemed too vague to identify to the species level, or often both simultaneously, this species is considered unidentifiable to the species level in modern taxonomy, although it technically remains a valid binomen.) placed incertae sedis in Formica
- Formica nana Jerdon, 1851, a species of ghost ant now known as Tapinoma nana, a junior synonym of Tapinoma melanocephalum
- Formica nana Smith, 1858, a species of carpenter ant now known as Camponotus nywet, a junior synonym of Camponotus novogranadensis
