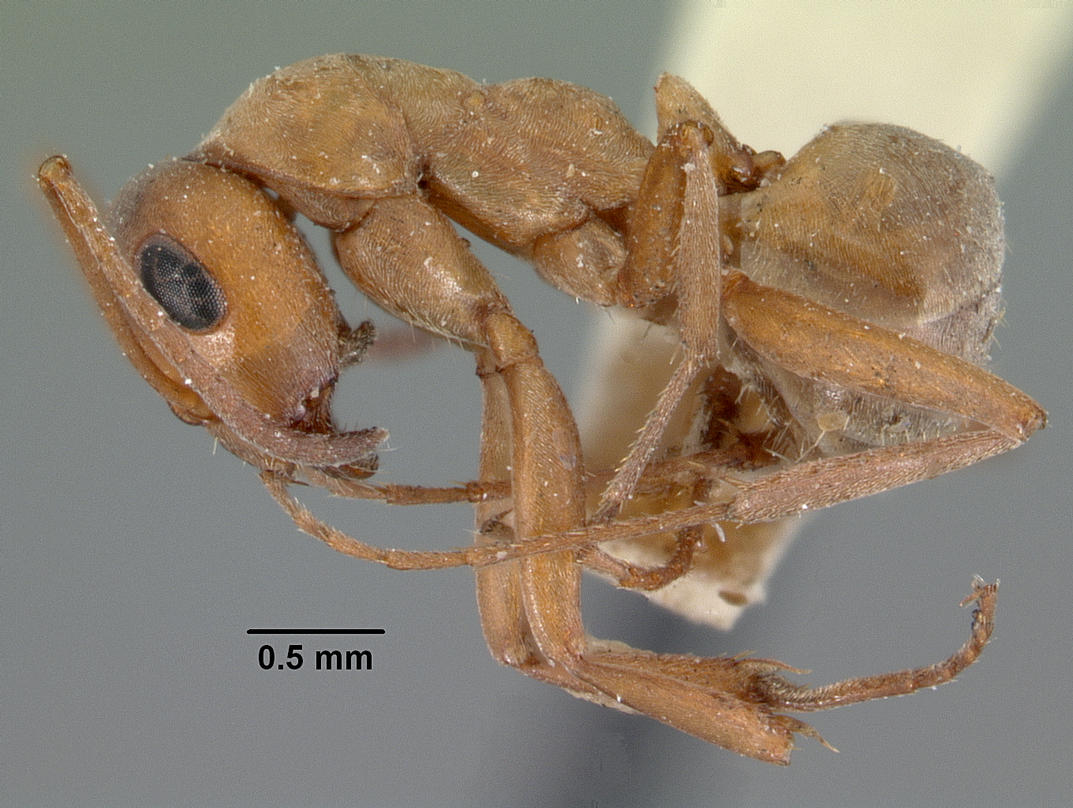

Scientific classification
- Domain: Eukaryota
- Kingdom: Animalia
- Phylum: Arthropoda
- Class: Insecta
- Order: Hymenoptera
- Family: Formicidae
- Subfamily: Formicinae
- Genus: Formica
- Species: F. neoclara

Binomial name
- Formica neoclara Emery, 1893

= Formica neoclara =

Species of ant

Formica neoclara is a species of ant in the family Formicidae. It is a generalist that has been known to have mutualistic relationships with 42 different species of aphids.
