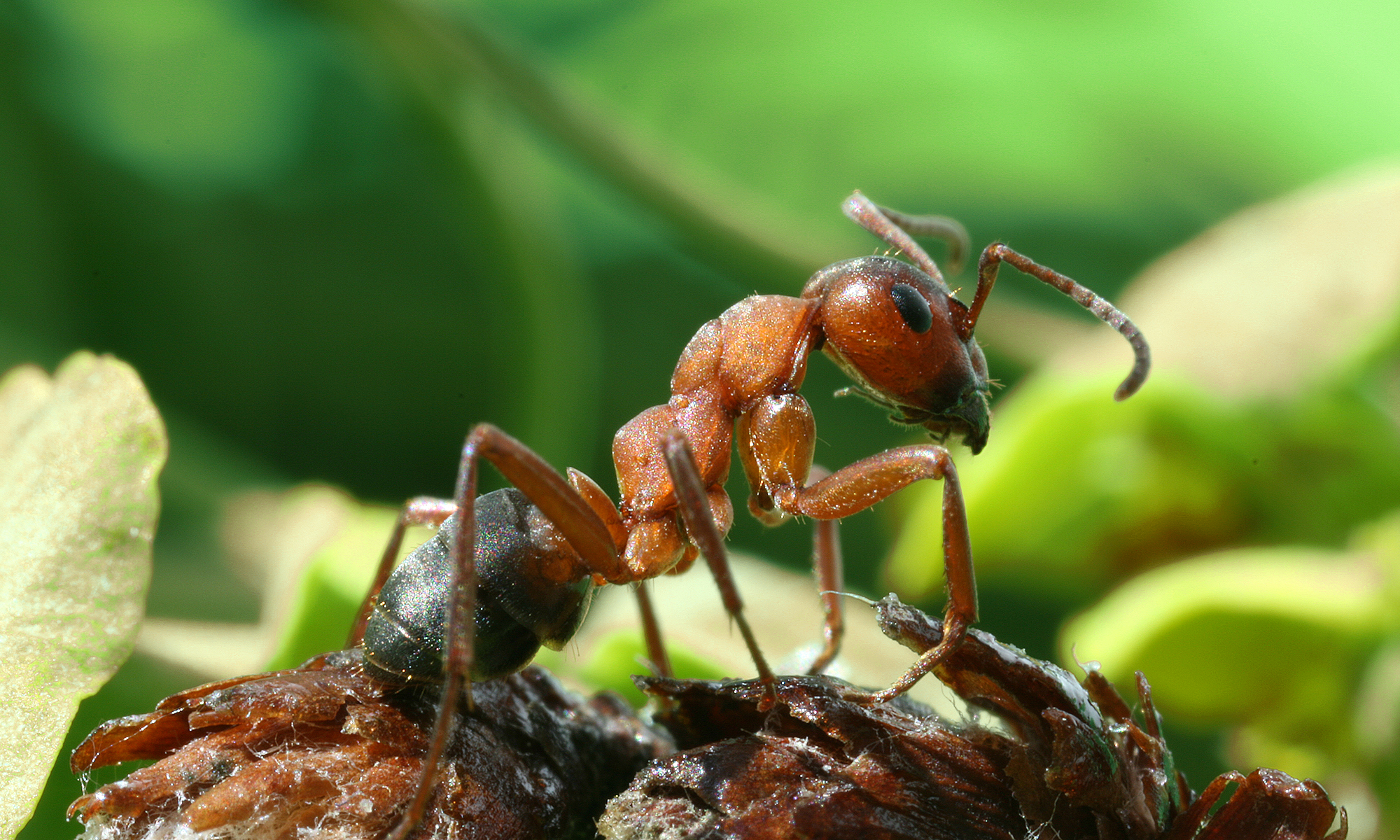
- Formica rufa worker, the type species of Formica, which in turn is the type genus of Formicini

Scientific classification
- Domain: Eukaryota
- Kingdom: Animalia
- Phylum: Arthropoda
- Class: Insecta
- Order: Hymenoptera
- Family: Formicidae
- Subfamily: Formicinae
- Tribe: Formicini; Latreille, 1809

Type genus
- Formica

= Formicini =

Tribe of ants

Formicini is a tribe of ants in the subfamily Formicinae.

== Genera ==
- Alloformica Dlussky, 1969
- †Asymphylomyrmex Wheeler, 1915
- Bajcaridris Agosti, 1994
- Cataglyphis Foerster, 1850
- †Cataglyphoides Dlussky, 2008
- †Conoformica Dlussky, 2008
- Formica Linnaeus, 1758
- †Glaphyromyrmex Wheeler, 1915
- Iberoformica Tinaut, 1990
- Polyergus Latreille, 1804 – Amazon ants
- Proformica Ruzsky, 1902
- †Protoformica Dlussky, 1967
- Rossomyrmex Arnol'di, 1928
