= List of ants of Minnesota =

This List of Minnesota ants lists all identified ant species found within Minnesota's borders.

== Ponerinae ==
- Ponera pennsylvanica

== Myrmicinae ==
- Aphaenogaster mariae
- A. picea
  - A. picea rudis
- A. tennesseensis
- A. treatae
- Crematogaster cerasi
- Crematogaster lineolata
- Harpagoxenus canadensis
- Leptothorax ambiguous
- L. longispinosus
- L. muscorum
- L. texanus
  - L. texanus davisi
- Monomorium minimum
- M. pharaonis - pharaoh ant
- Myrmica alaskensi
- M. americana
- M. detrinodis
- M. emeryana
- M. evanida
- M. fracticornis
- M. incompleta
- M. lobifrons
- M. punctiventris
- M. sculptilis
- Pheidole bicarinata
- P. pilifera
- Protomognathus americanus
- Smithistruma pergandei (Strumigenys pergandei)
- S. pulchella (Strumigenys pulchella)
- Solenopsis molesta
- Stenamma brevicorne
- S. diecki
- S. impar
- S. schmitti

== Dolichoderinae ==
- Dolichoderus mariae
- Dolichoderus plagiatus (Hypoclinea plagiata)
- D. pustulatus (Hypoclinea pustulatas)
- D. taschenbergi (Hypoclinea taschenbergi)
- Dorymyrmex pyramicus
- Forelius pruinosus (Iridomyrmex pruinosum)
- Tapinoma melanocephalum - ghost ant (tropical species found in greenhouses in Hennepin and Ramsey counties)
- T. sessile

== Formicinae ==
- Acanthomyops claviger
- A. interjectus
- A. latipes
- A. occidentalis
- A. plumopilosus
- A. pubescens
- A. subglaber
- Brachymyrmex depilis
- Camponotus americanus
- C. discolor (C. caryae discolor)
- C. herculeanus
- C. modoc (C. pennsylvanicus modoc)
- C. nearcticus
- C. novaeboracensis
- C. pennsylvanicus - black carpenter ant
- Formica argentea
- F. aserva (F. subnuda)
- F. bradleyi
- F. ciliate
- F. dakotensis
- F. emeryi
- F. exsectoides - Allegheny mound ant
- F. fossaceps
- F. fusca
- F. glacialis
- F. hewitti
- F. impexa
- F. incerta
- F. lasioides
- F. limata
- F. montana
- F. neogagates
- F. neorufibarbis
- F. obscuripes
- F. obscuriventris (F. rufa gymnamma)
- F. obtusopilosa
- F. nitidiventris
- F. oreas comptula
- F. podzolica
- F. reflexa
- F. spatulata
- F. subsericea
- F. pergandei (F. sublucida)
- F. ulkei
- F. whymperi adamsi
- Lasius alienus (L. alienus americanus)
- L. minutus (L. bicornis minutus)
- L. flavus (L. brevicornis)
- L. nearcticus (L. flavus nearcticus)
- L. neoniger (L. niger neoniger)
- L. pallitarsis
- L. speculiventris
- L. subumbratus
- L. umbratus (L. subumbratus epinotalis, L. umbratus aphidcola)
- Paratrechina parvula
- Polyergus breviceps (Rusfescens fusciventris, Rufescens fusciventris)
- Prenolepis imparis
- Yeongsunperi parksi
