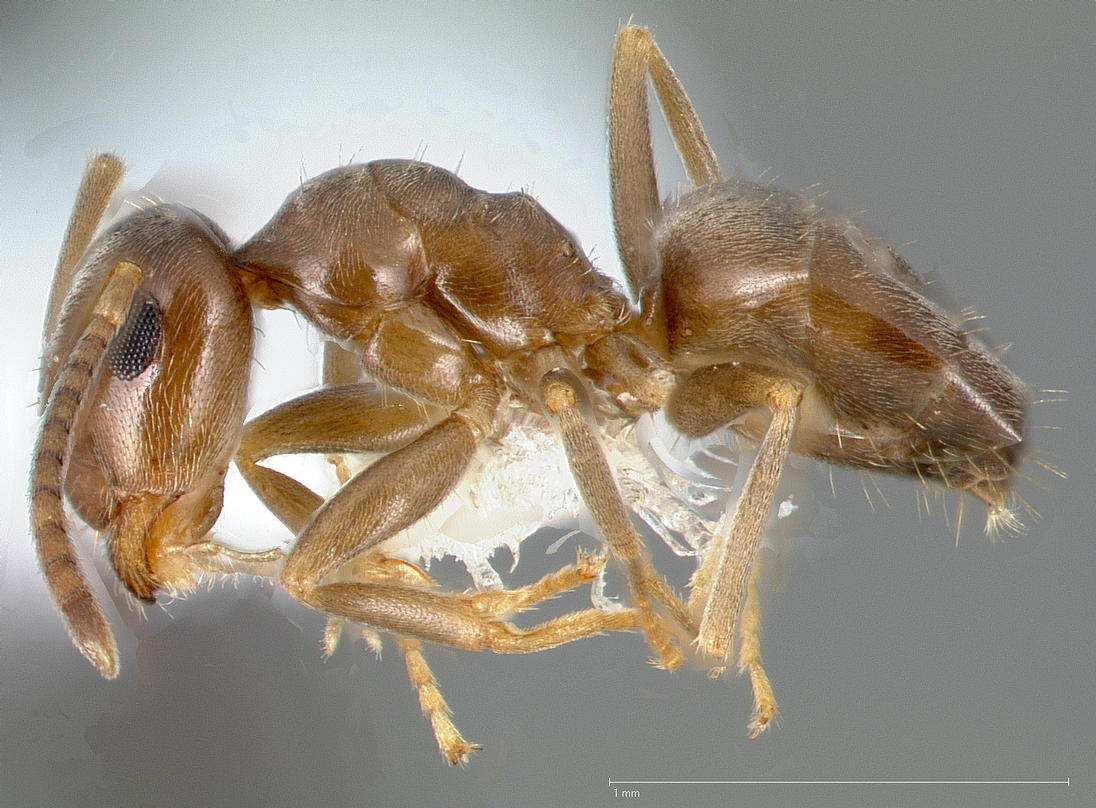

Scientific classification
- Kingdom: Animalia
- Phylum: Arthropoda
- Class: Insecta
- Order: Hymenoptera
- Family: Formicidae
- Subfamily: Formicinae
- Tribe: Lasiini
- Genus: Lasius
- Species: L. crypticus

Binomial name
- Lasius crypticus Wilson, 1955

= Lasius crypticus =

Species of ant

Lasius crypticus is a species of ant in the family Formicidae.
