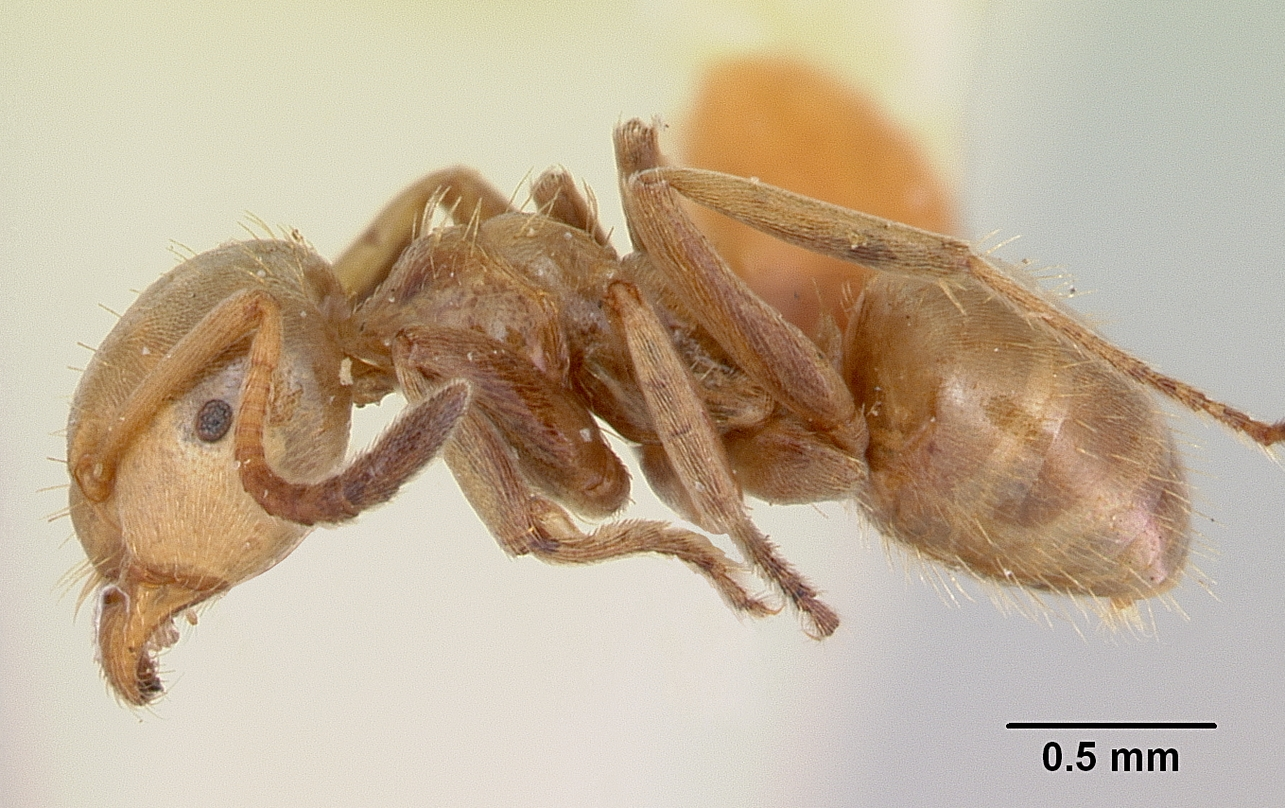
- Lasius bureni worker

Scientific classification
- Domain: Eukaryota
- Kingdom: Animalia
- Phylum: Arthropoda
- Class: Insecta
- Order: Hymenoptera
- Family: Formicidae
- Subfamily: Formicinae
- Genus: Lasius
- Species: L. bureni

Binomial name
- Lasius bureni Wing, 1968

= Lasius bureni =

Species of ant

Lasius bureni is a species of ant belonging to the genus Lasius, formerly a part of the subgenus Acanthomyops. Described in 1968 by Wing, the species is native to the United States.
