= Lasius balearicus =

Scientific classification
- Kingdom: Animalia
- Phylum: Arthropoda
- Clade: Pancrustacea
- Class: Insecta
- Order: Hymenoptera
- Family: Formicidae
- Subfamily: Formicinae
- Genus: Lasius
- Species: L. balearicus

Binomial name
- Lasius balearicus Talavera et al., 2014

Species of ant

Lasius balearicus is an ant species from the genus Lasius. It was described as a new species in 2014 and is the first known ant endemic to the Balearic Islands. It is endemic to the island of Majorca and has only been recorded from seven mountains in the Serra de Tramuntana at elevations of 800–1,400 m (2,600–4,600 ft). It inhabits rocky calcareous areas with scattered shrubby vegetation, especially Hypericum balearicum and Genista valdes-bermejoi. Worker are about 4 mm long and have distinctive yellowish-brown, very hairy bodies. The scientists who described Lasius balearicus recommended listing the species as being endangered on the IUCN Red List. The total population size of Lasius balearicus is thought to be less than 2500 nests. The species has a very restricted elevation range and is threatened by climate change, with the most pessimistic predictions suggesting that it might go extinct by 2050 or 2080 because of climate change.

== Taxonomy ==
Lasius balearicus was discovered in 1982 by Cedric Alex Collingwood, an entomologist from the Royal Entomological Society, and described as a new species in 2014 after a team from the Institut de Biologia Evolutiva in Barcelona collected the holotype in 2008. DNA evidence suggests that it diverged from its nearest relatives 1.51 million years ago. The last land bridge connecting Majorca and Iberia existed around 5 million years ago, suggesting that L. balearicus colonised the island after the land bridge had disappeared. Several other mainland Lasius species are also found in the Balearic Islands, suggesting that dispersal across the Mediterranean is not an unusual event in this genus.

== Description ==
The total length of a Lasius balearicus worker is about 4 mm. The body is distinctive yellowish-brown and very hairy.

== Distribution and habitat ==
Lasius balearicus is endemic to the island of Majorca and has only been recorded from seven mountains in the Serra de Tramuntana at elevations of 800–1,400 m (2,600–4,600 ft). The species inhabits rocky calcareous areas with scattered shrubby vegetation, especially Hypericum balearicum and Genista valdes-bermejoi. Specimens have been collected from their nests under rocks and from nearby vegetation, frequently attending to aphids. It is highly intolerant of forested habitats, not having been recorded from forested areas that are otherwise highly suitable for it. The species is the first known ant endemic to the Balearic Islands and the first Lasius species endemic to the islands of the Mediterranean .

== Status ==
The scientists who described Lasius balearicus recommended listing the species as being endangered on the IUCN Red List due to a multitude of threats facing it. The species has a very narrow niche inhabiting the highest elevation peaks on Majorca and is unlikely to be able to adapt to any changes in its habitat due to climate change. Loss in suitable habitat caused by climate change will likely lead to Lasius balearicus disappearing from its lowest elevational range, and the species will not be able to increase its distribution without an improbable dispersal to mainland Iberia or larger islands like Sardinia and Corsica. Lasius balearicus also has low genetic diversity and long generation times, rendering it unable to adapt to sudden changes in climatic conditions. In the most dramatic scenarios, the species is predicted to go extinct by 2050 or 2080. Other threats to the species include invasive goats, forest fires, and competition with Lasius grandis. The total population size of Lasius balearicus is thought to be less than 2500 nests.
