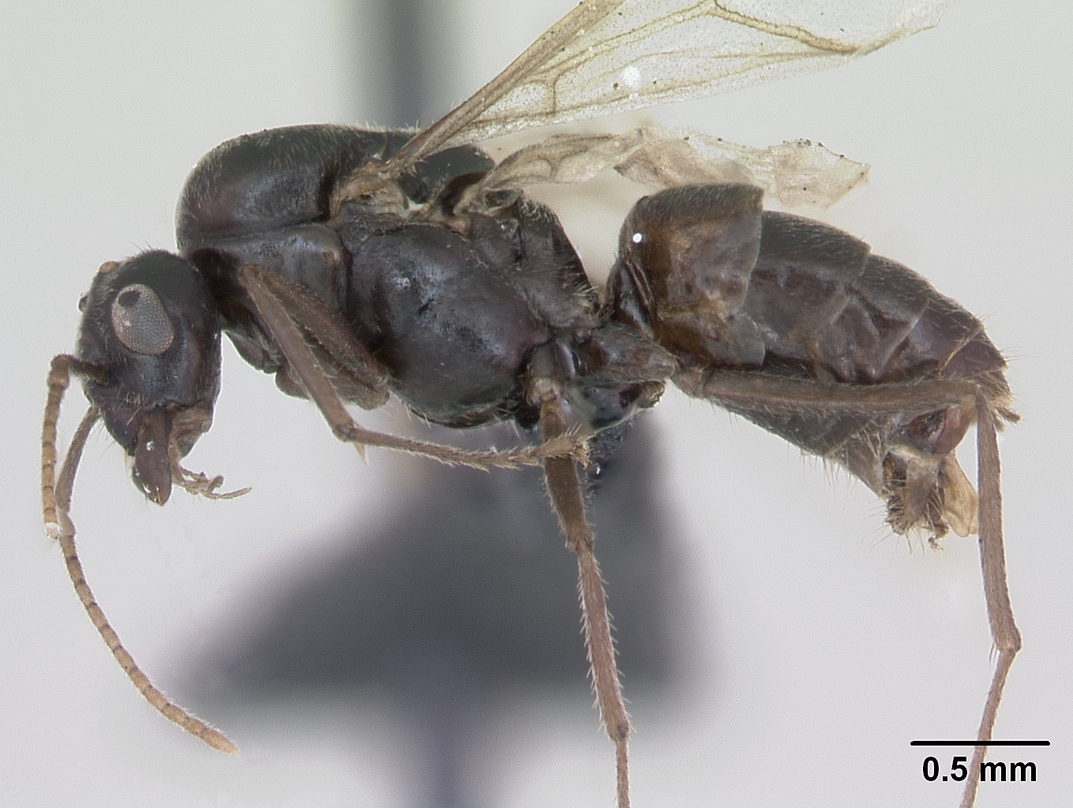

Scientific classification
- Domain: Eukaryota
- Kingdom: Animalia
- Phylum: Arthropoda
- Class: Insecta
- Order: Hymenoptera
- Family: Formicidae
- Subfamily: Formicinae
- Genus: Lasius
- Species: L. platythorax

Binomial name
- Lasius platythorax Seifert, 1991

= Lasius platythorax =

Species of ant

Lasius platythorax is a species of ants belonging to the family Formicidae.

It is native to Europe.
