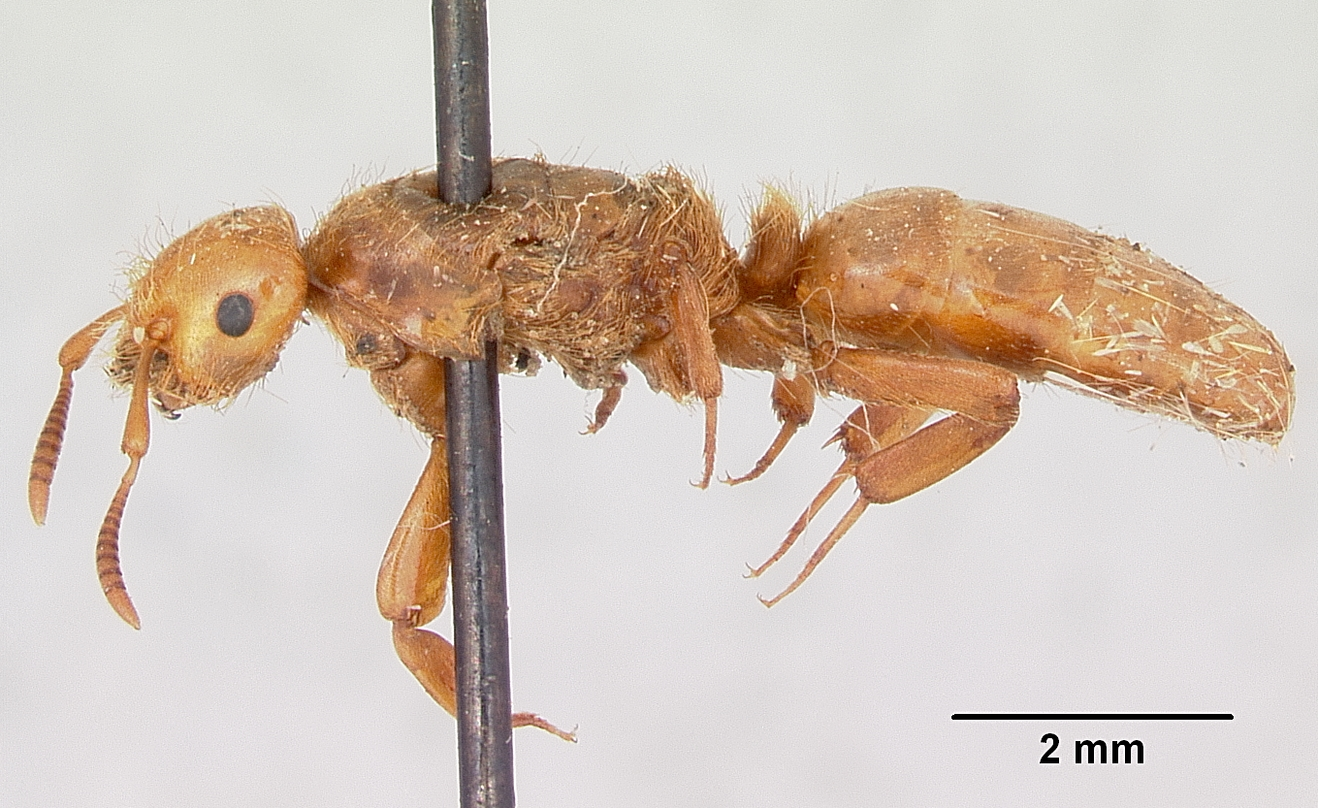
- Lasius pogonogynus dealate queen

Scientific classification
- Domain: Eukaryota
- Kingdom: Animalia
- Phylum: Arthropoda
- Class: Insecta
- Order: Hymenoptera
- Family: Formicidae
- Subfamily: Formicinae
- Genus: Lasius
- Species: L. pogonogynus

Binomial name
- Lasius pogonogynus Buren, 1950

= Lasius pogonogynus =

Species of ant

Lasius pogonogynus is a species of ant belonging to the genus Lasius, formerly part of the genus (now a subgenus) Acanthomyops. Described in 1950 by Buren, the species is native to the United States.
