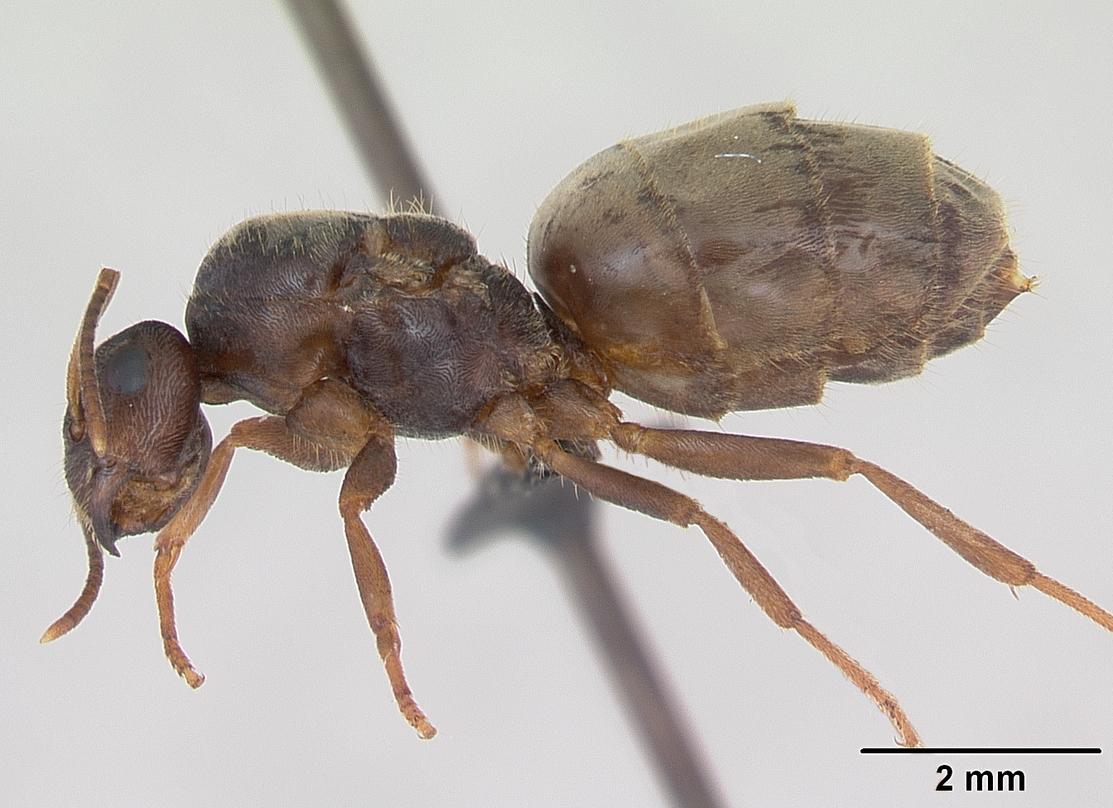

Scientific classification
- Domain: Eukaryota
- Kingdom: Animalia
- Phylum: Arthropoda
- Class: Insecta
- Order: Hymenoptera
- Family: Formicidae
- Subfamily: Formicinae
- Genus: Lasius
- Species: L. psammophilus

Binomial name
- Lasius psammophilus Seifert, 1992

= Lasius psammophilus =

Species of insect

Lasius psammophilus is a species of ant belonging to the family Formicidae.

It is native to Europe.
