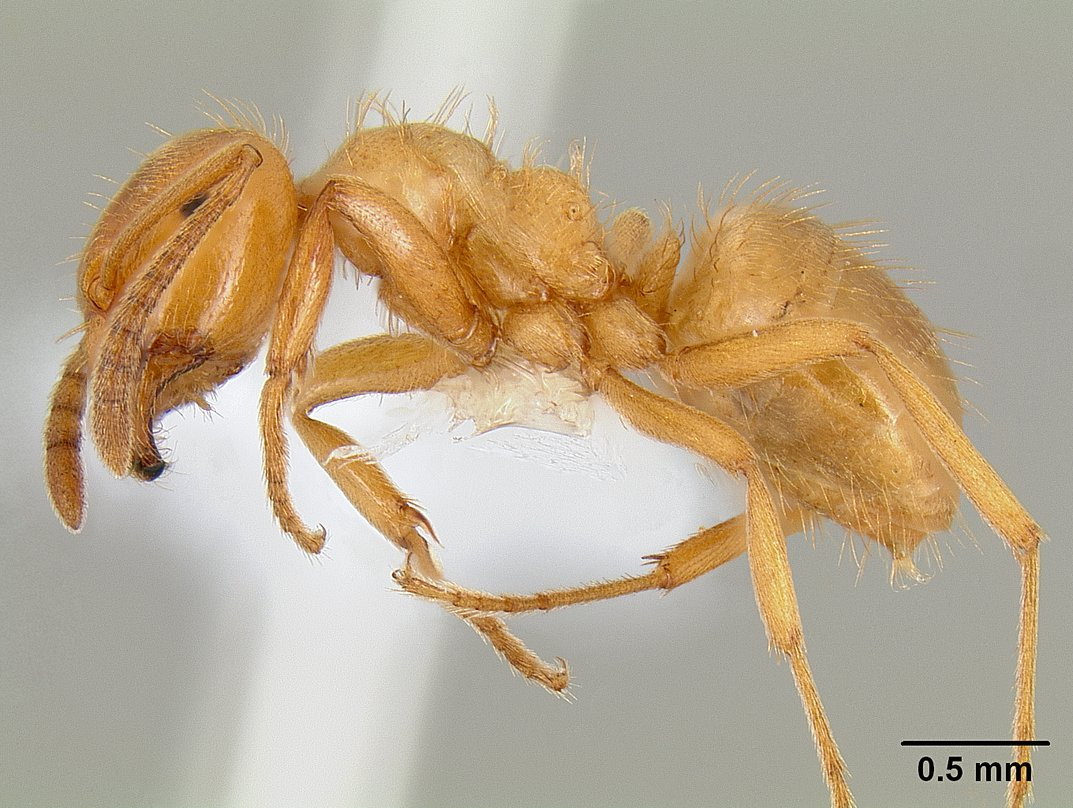
- Lasius californicus worker

Scientific classification
- Domain: Eukaryota
- Kingdom: Animalia
- Phylum: Arthropoda
- Class: Insecta
- Order: Hymenoptera
- Family: Formicidae
- Subfamily: Formicinae
- Genus: Lasius
- Species: L. californicus

Binomial name
- Lasius californicus Wheeler, 1917

= Lasius californicus =

Species of ant

Lasius californicus is a species of ant belonging to the genus Lasius, and was formerly a part of the genus Acanthomyops (now a subgenus). Described in 1917 by Wheeler, the species is native to the United States.
