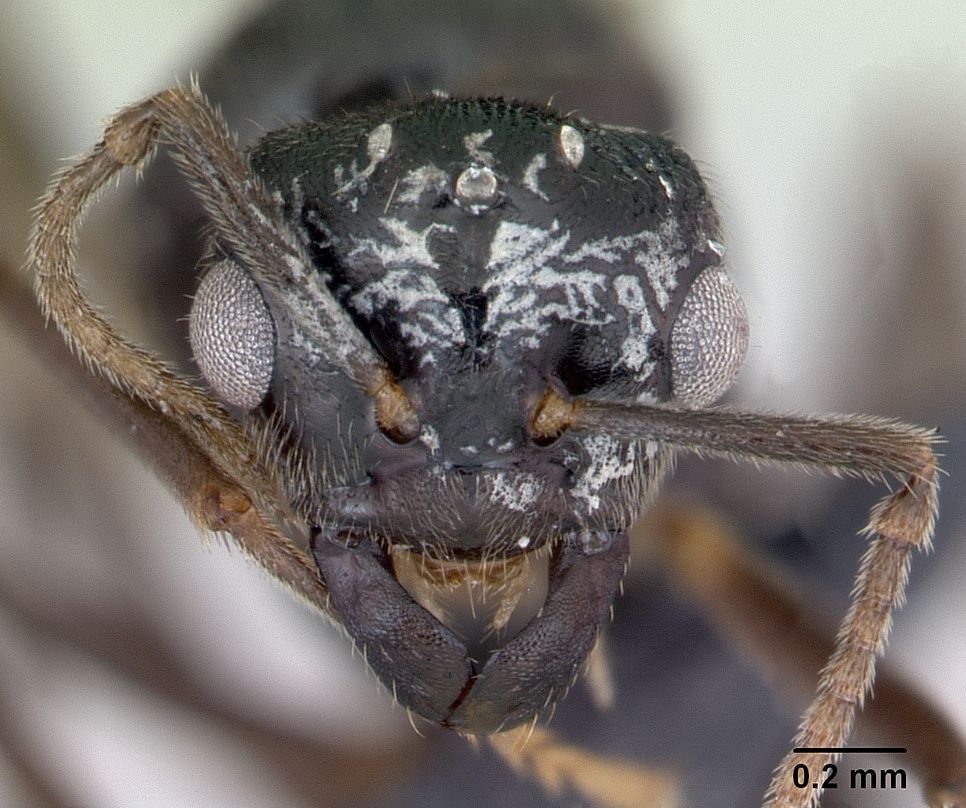

Scientific classification
- Domain: Eukaryota
- Kingdom: Animalia
- Phylum: Arthropoda
- Class: Insecta
- Order: Hymenoptera
- Family: Formicidae
- Subfamily: Formicinae
- Genus: Lasius
- Subgenus: Chthonolasius
- Species: L. mixtus

Binomial name
- Lasius mixtus (Nylander, 1846)

= Lasius mixtus =

Species of insect

Lasius mixtus is a species of ant belonging to the family Formicidae.

It is native to Europe and Northern America. It is primarily subterranean and socially parasitic. It can be distinguished from a similar species Lasius umbratus by the lack of erect or suberect hairs on the scapes and tibiae, and lower petiolar apex.

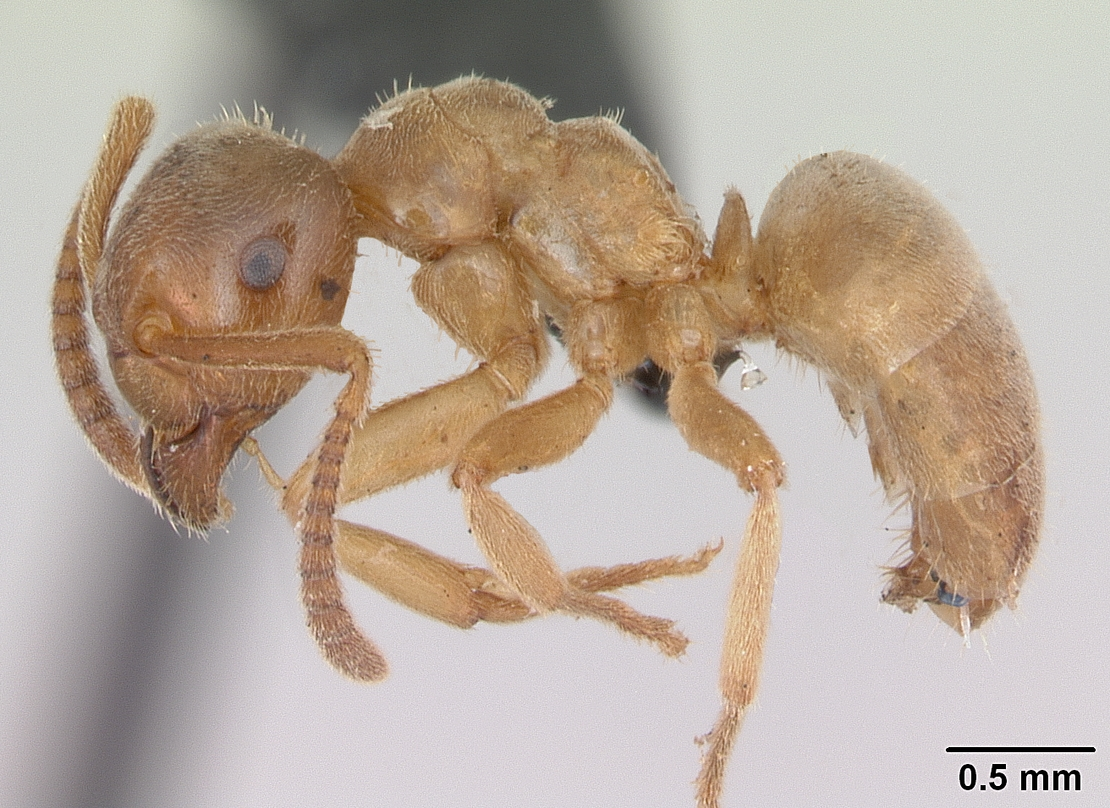
antweb.org worker specimen
