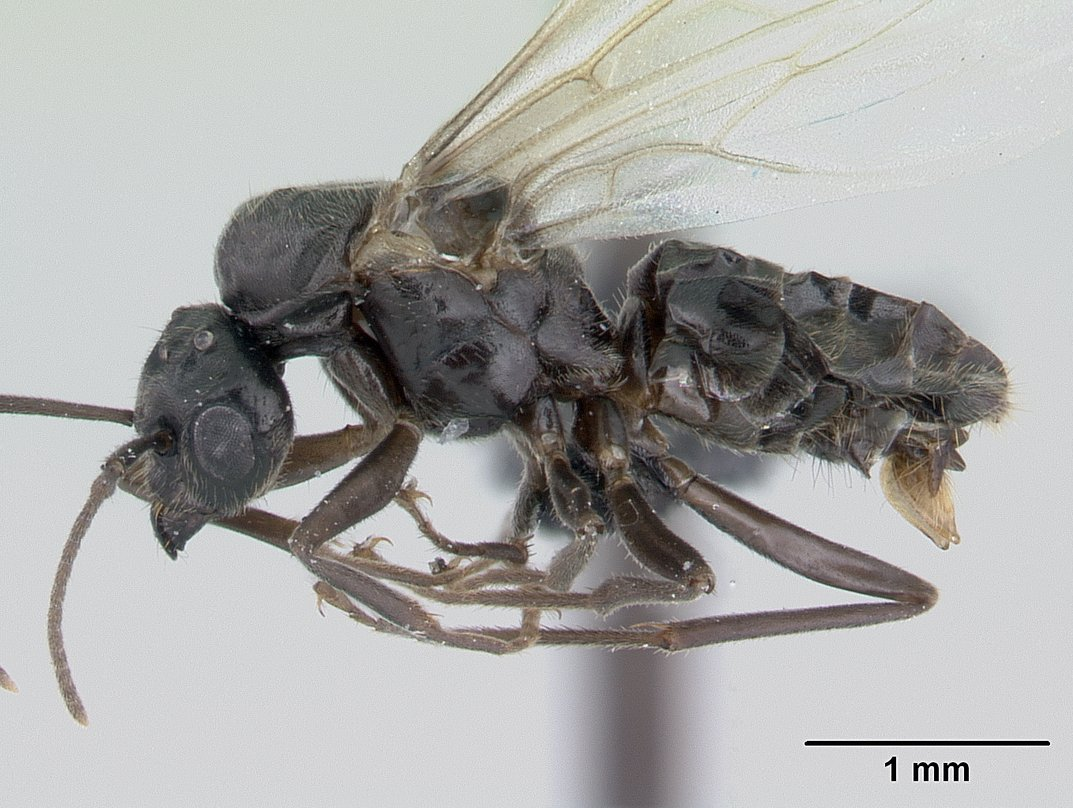
- Lasius niger, type species.

Scientific classification
- Kingdom: Animalia
- Phylum: Arthropoda
- Clade: Pancrustacea
- Class: Insecta
- Order: Hymenoptera
- Family: Formicidae
- Subfamily: Formicinae
- Tribe: Lasiini
- Genus: Lasius; Fabricius, 1804

Diversity
- 149 species

Synonyms
- Donisthorpea Morice & Durrant, 1915; Tylolasius Zhang, J., 1989

= Lasius =

Lasius Temporal range: Eocene-Present, 46–0 Ma

Genus of ants

Lasius is a genus of formicine ants. The type species for this genus is the black garden ant, Lasius niger. Other major members, which live in drier heathland, are the cornfield ant, L. neoniger, and L. alienus. Other species include the temporary social parasites of the L. mixtus group and the hyper-social parasite L. fuliginosus. Lasius flavus is also a commonly seen species, building grassy hillocks in undisturbed pasture. In the Alps, these mounds – always aligned east to catch the first rays of the rising sun – have been traditionally used by goatherds as natural compasses. Species in the subgenus Acanthomyops, in particular L. interjectus and L. claviger, are commonly known as citronella ants due to their citronella-like smell.

== Social parasitism ==
Several species in this genus are noted to be social parasites. Some species such as Lasius latipes and Lasius murphyi are noted to have their mating flights in mid-late summer and invade other colonies of Lasius, primarily Lasius neoniger. The queens of species Lasius orientalis and Lasius umbratus have been observed using chemical signals to invade other Lasius colonies and trick the workers to kill the residing queen, accepting the invading queen as their own. Other species, such as Lasius claviger, are known to overwinter and invade colonies in the spring.

== Moisture ants ==
Many Lasius species, known collectively as "moisture ants" in the United States, make their nests in and around moist rotting wood as well as under rocks. They can infest buildings, particularly foundation forms in contact with soil, becoming a minor nuisance. They are not considered a structural threat because they only make their galleries in wood that is already decayed. Some species build "cartonlike" nests in moist locations made of decayed wood fragments cemented together with honeydew and the ant's mandibular gland secretions. Workers are monomorphic, 2 to 3 mm long, yellow to dark brown. They are secretive, and forage mostly at night for honeydew and other sweet substances, and may also prey on small insects. Winged reproductive males and females swarm in late summer and fall, which is when building infestations may be noticed. They are distinguished from carpenter ants (Camponotus), another structure-infesting species, by being much smaller, and having a notch in the dorsal thorax (top of the center body division), where carpenter ants have a rounded thorax. Widespread moisture ant species include L. alienus and L. neoniger, as well as some Acanthomyops species.

== Species ==
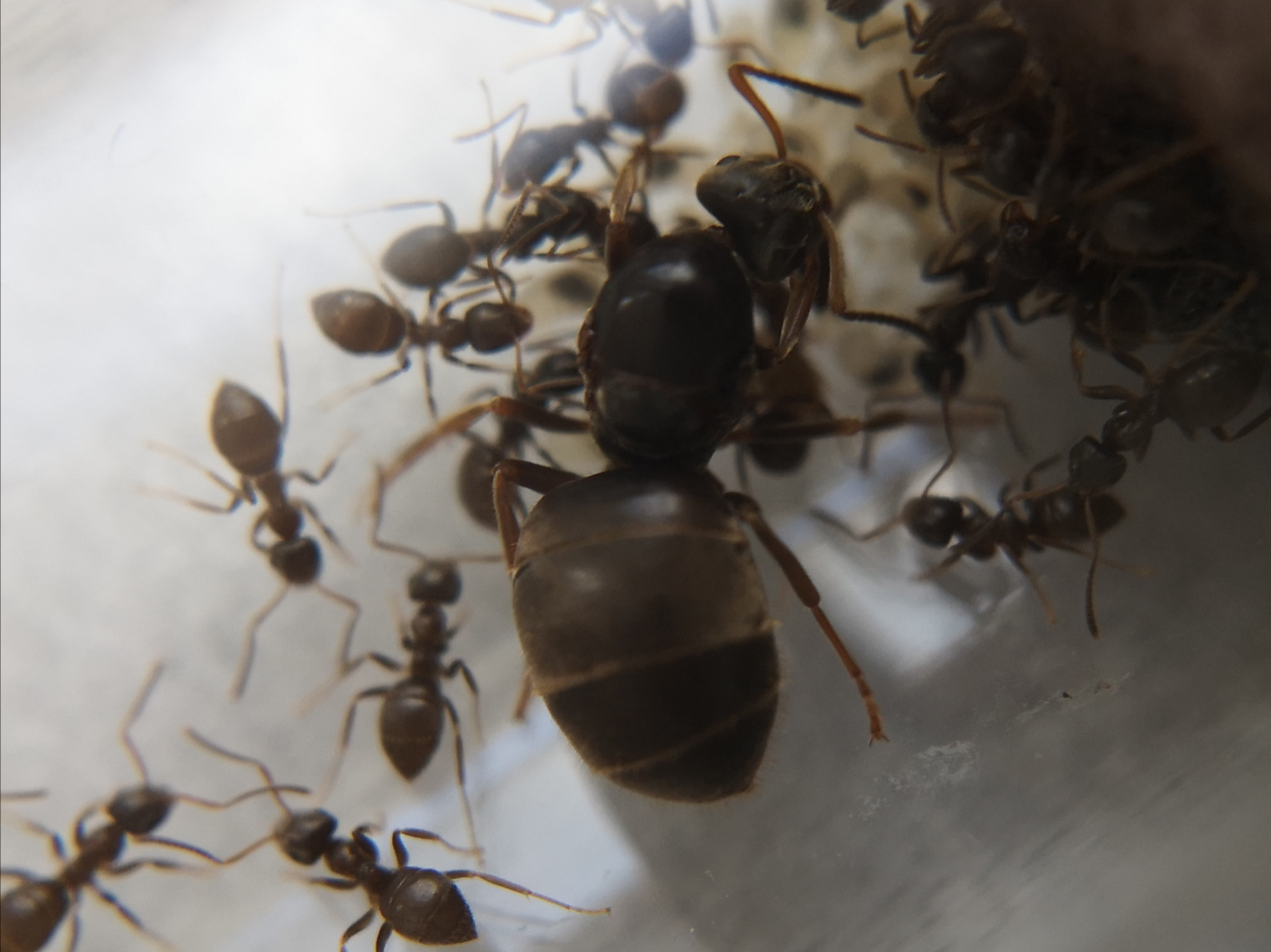
Black garden ant, Lasius niger

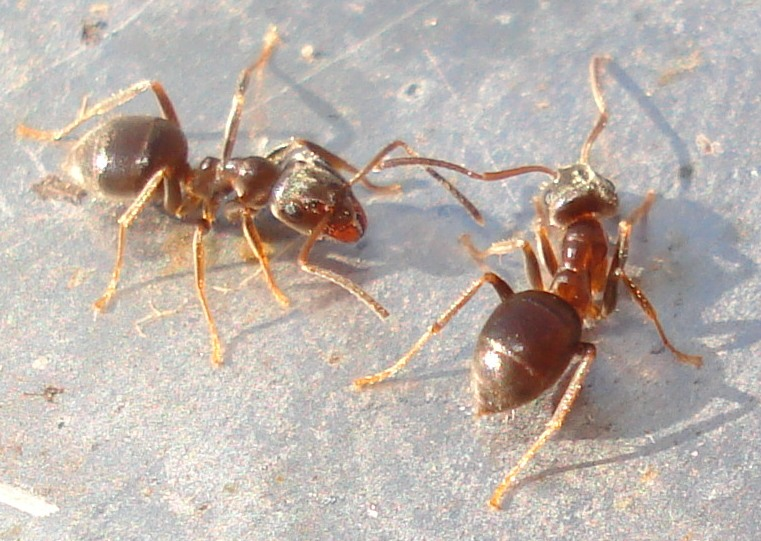
Cornfield ant, Lasius alienus

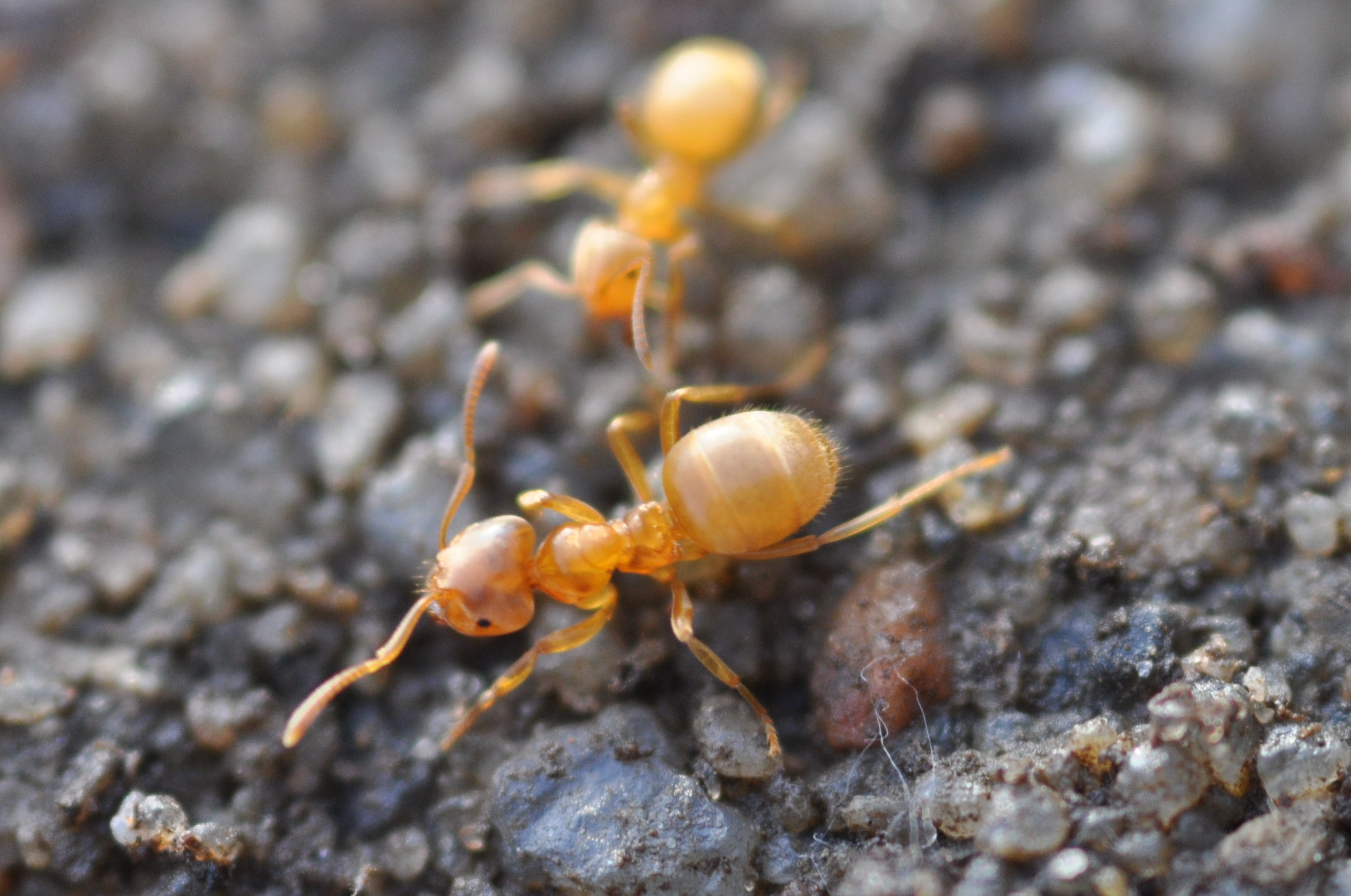
Lasius flavus

- Lasius alienoflavus Bingham, 1903
- Lasius alienus (Foerster, 1850)
- Lasius americanus Emery 1893
- †Lasius anthracinus (Heer, 1867)
- Lasius aphidicola (Walsh, 1863)
- Lasius arizonicus Wheeler, 1917
- Lasius atopus Cole, 1958
- Lasius austriacus Schlick-Steiner, Steiner, Schödl & Seifert, 2003
- Lasius balcanicus Seifert, 1988
- Lasius balearicus Talavera, Espadaler & Vila, 2014
- Lasius bicornis (Foerster, 1850)
- Lasius bombycina Seifert & Galkowski, 2016
- Lasius brevicornis Emery 1893
- Lasius brevipalpus Seifert, 2020
- Lasius brunneus (Latreille, 1798)
- Lasius buccatus Stärcke, 1942
- Lasius bureni (Wing, 1968)
- Lasius californicus Wheeler, 1917
- Lasius capitatus (Kuznetsov-Ugamsky, 1927)
- Lasius carniolicus Mayr, 1861
- Lasius casevitzi Seifert & Galkowski, 2016
- †Lasius chambonensis Piton & Théobald, 1935
- Lasius chinensis Seifert, 2020
- Lasius cinereus Seifert, 1992
- Lasius citrinus Emery, 1922
- Lasius claviger (Roger, 1862)
- Lasius colei (Wing, 1968)
- Lasius coloradensis Wheeler, 1917
- Lasius coloratus Santschi, 1937
- Lasius creightoni (Wing, 1968)
- Lasius creticus Seifert, 2020
- Lasius crinitus (Smith, 1858)
- †Lasius crispus Wilson, 1955
- Lasius crypticus Wilson, 1955
- Lasius distinguendus (Emery, 1916)
- Lasius draco Collingwood, 1982
- Lasius elevatus Bharti & Gul, 2013
- Lasius emarginatus (Olivier, 1792)
- †Lasius epicentrus Théobald, 1937
- Lasius escamole Reza, 1925
- Lasius excavatus Seifert, 2020
- Lasius fallax Wilson, 1955
- Lasius flavescens Forel, 1904
- Lasius flavoniger Seifert, 1992
- Lasius flavus (Fabricius, 1782)
- Lasius fuji Radchenko, 2005
- Lasius fuliginosus (Latreille, 1798)
- †Lasius globularis (Heer, 1849)
- †Lasius glom LaPolla & Greenwalt, 2015
- Lasius grandis Forel, 1909
- Lasius hayashi Yamauchi & Hayashida, 1970
- Lasius hikosanus Yamauchi, 1979
- Lasius himalayanus Bingham, 1903
- Lasius hirsutus Seifert, 1992
- Lasius humilis Wheeler, 1917
- Lasius illyricus Zimmermann, 1935
- †Lasius inflatus (Zhang, 1989)
- Lasius interjectus Mayr, 1866
- Lasius israelicus Seifert, 2020
- Lasius japonicus Santschi, 1941
- Lasius jensi Seifert, 1982
- Lasius kabaki Seifert, 2020
- Lasius karpinisi Seifert, 1992
- Lasius koreanus Seifert, 1992
- Lasius kritikos Seifert, 2020
- Lasius lasioides (Emery, 1869)
- Lasius latipes (Walsh, 1863)
- Lasius lawarai Seifert, 1992
- †Lasius longaevus (Heer, 1849)
- Lasius longiceps Seifert, 1988
- Lasius longicirrus Chang & He, 2002
- Lasius longipalpus Seifert, 2020
- †Lasius longipennis (Heer, 1849)
- Lasius magnus Seifert, 1992
- Lasius maltaeus Seifert, 2020
- Lasius mauretanicus Seifert, 2020
- Lasius meridionalis (Bondroit, 1920)
- Lasius mexicanus Wheeler, 1914
- Lasius mikir Collingwood, 1982
- Lasius minutus Emery, 1893
- Lasius mixtus (Nylander, 1846)
- †Lasius mordicus Zhang, 1989
- Lasius morisitai Yamauchi, 1979
- Lasius murphyi Forel, 1901
- Lasius myops Forel, 1894
- Lasius myrmidon Mei, 1998
- Lasius nearcticus Wheeler, 1906
- Lasius neglectus Van Loon, Boomsma & Andrasfalvy, 1990
- †Lasius nemorivagus Wheeler, 1915
- Lasius neoniger Emery, 1893
- Lasius nevadensis Cole, 1956
- Lasius niger (Linnaeus, 1758)
- Lasius nigrescens Stitz, 1930
- Lasius nipponensis Forel, 1912
- Lasius nitidigaster Seifert, 1996
- †Lasius oblongus Assmann, 1870
- Lasius obscuratus Stitz, 1930
- Lasius occidentalis Wheeler, 1909
- †Lasius occultatus (Heer, 1849)
- †Lasius ophthalmicus (Heer, 1849)
- Lasius orientalis Karavaiev, 1912
- Lasius pallitarsis (Provancher, 1881)
- Lasius paralienus Seifert, 1992
- †Lasius peritulus (Cockerell, 1927)
- Lasius persicus Seifert, 2020
- Lasius piliferus Seifert, 1992
- Lasius platythorax Seifert, 1991
- Lasius plumopilosus Buren, 1941
- Lasius pogonogynus Buren, 1950
- Lasius precursor Seifert, 2020
- Lasius productus Wilson, 1955
- Lasius przewalskii Ruzsky, 1915
- Lasius psammophilus Seifert, 1992
- Lasius pubescens Buren, 1942
- †Lasius pumilus Mayr, 1868
- †Lasius punctulatus Mayr, 1868
- Lasius rabaudi (Bondroit, 1917)
- Lasius reginae Faber, 1967
- Lasius sabularum (Bondroit, 1918)
- Lasius sakagamii Yamauchi & Hayashida, 1970
- Lasius schaeferi Seifert, 1992
- †Lasius schiefferdeckeri Mayr, 1868
- Lasius schulzi Seifert, 1992
- Lasius sichuense Seifert, 2020
- Lasius silvaticus Seifert, 2020
- Lasius sitiens Wilson, 1955
- Lasius sonobei Yamauchi, 1979
- Lasius spathepus Wheeler, 1910
- Lasius speculiventris Emery, 1893
- Lasius subglaber Emery, 1893
- Lasius subumbratus Viereck, 1903
- Lasius talpa Wilson, 1955
- Lasius tapinomoides Salata & Borowiec, 2018
- Lasius tebessae Seifert, 1992
- †Lasius tertiarius Zalessky, 1949
- Lasius tibialis Santschi, 1936
- †Lasius truncatus Zhang, 1989
- Lasius tunisius Seifert, 2020
- Lasius turcicus Santschi, 1921
- Lasius umbratus (Nylander, 1846)
- Lasius uzbeki Seifert, 1992
- †Lasius validus Zhang, 1989
- Lasius vestitus Wheeler, 1910
- †Lasius vetulus Dlussky, 1981
- Lasius viehmeyeri Emery, 1922
- Lasius vostochni Seifert, 2020
- Lasius wittmeri Seifert, 1992
- Lasius xerophilus MacKay & MacKay, 1994
