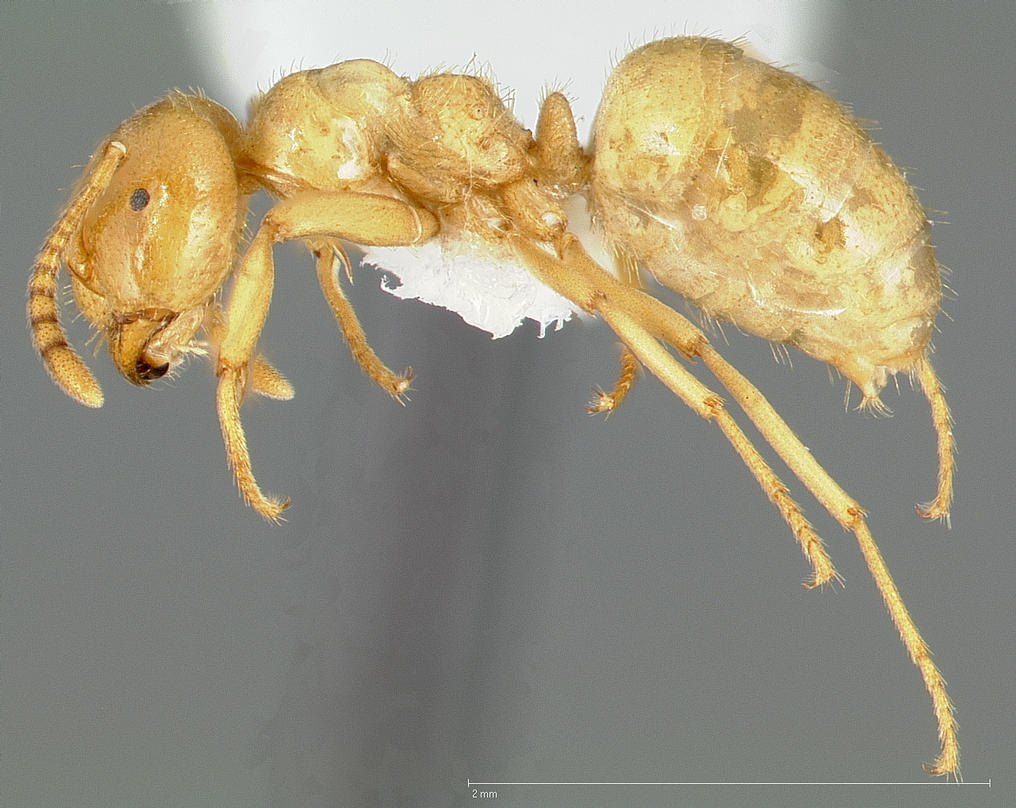

Conservation status
- Vulnerable (IUCN 2.3)

Scientific classification
- Kingdom: Animalia
- Phylum: Arthropoda
- Class: Insecta
- Order: Hymenoptera
- Family: Formicidae
- Subfamily: Formicinae
- Genus: Lasius
- Subgenus: Acanthomyops
- Species: L. murphyi

Binomial name
- Lasius murphyi Forel, 1901

Synonyms
- Acanthomyops murphyi (Forel, 1901); Lasius murphii Forel, 1901

= Lasius murphyi =

Species of ant

Lasius murphyi is a species of ant in the genus Lasius. It is endemic to the United States and Canada.
