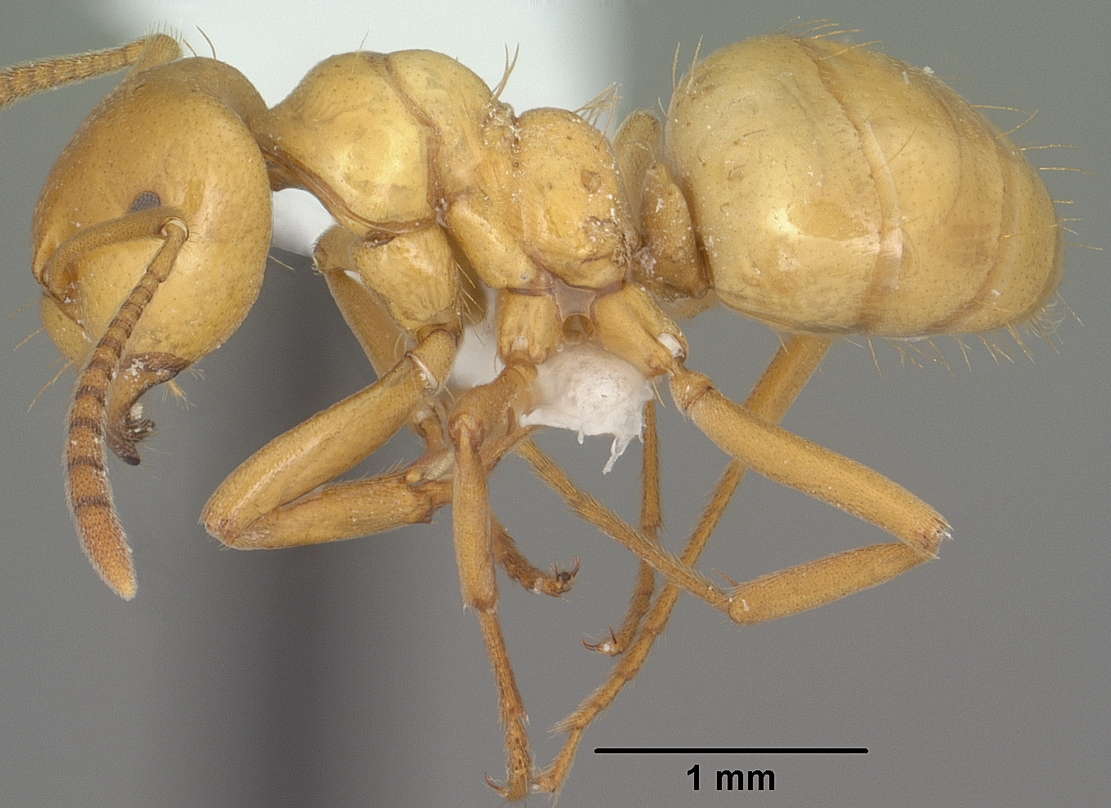
- Lasius arizonicus worker

Scientific classification
- Domain: Eukaryota
- Kingdom: Animalia
- Phylum: Arthropoda
- Class: Insecta
- Order: Hymenoptera
- Family: Formicidae
- Subfamily: Formicinae
- Genus: Lasius
- Subgenus: Acanthomyops
- Species: L. arizonicus

Binomial name
- Lasius arizonicus Wheeler, 1917

= Lasius arizonicus =

Species of ant

Lasius arizonicus is a species of ant belonging to the genus Lasius, formerly a part of the genus (now a subgenus) Acanthomyops. Described in 1917 by William Morton Wheeler, the species is native to the United States.
