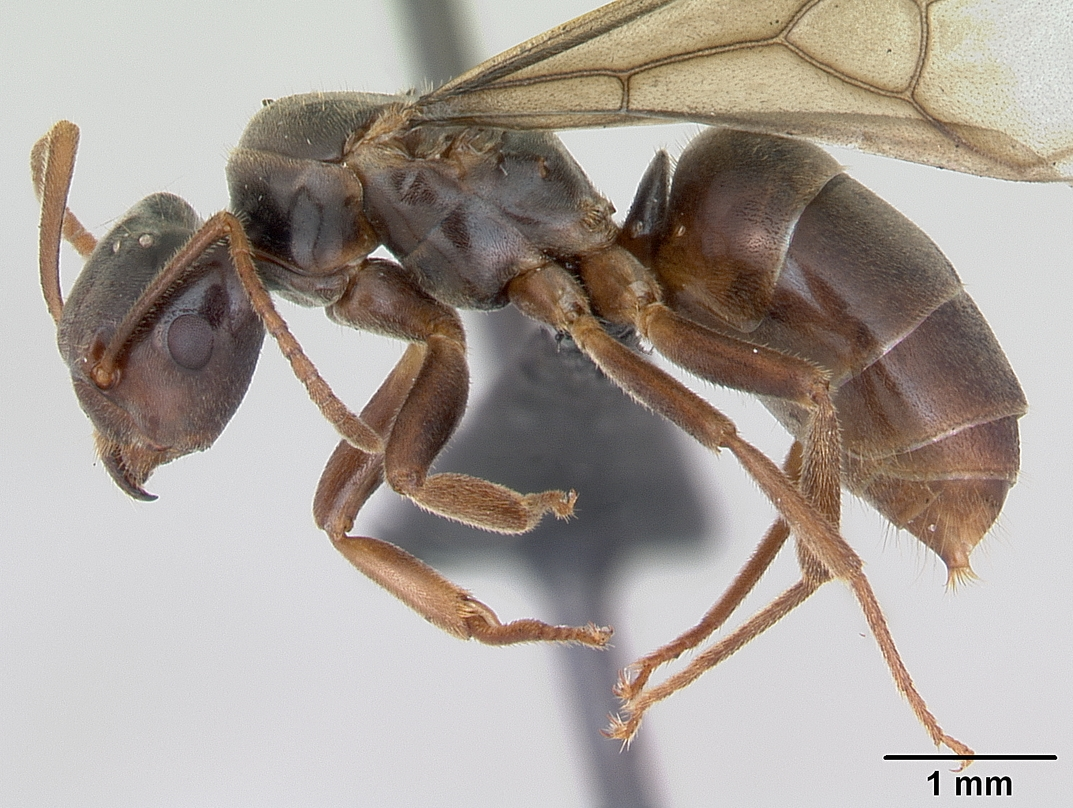

Scientific classification
- Domain: Eukaryota
- Kingdom: Animalia
- Phylum: Arthropoda
- Class: Insecta
- Order: Hymenoptera
- Family: Formicidae
- Subfamily: Formicinae
- Genus: Lasius
- Subgenus: Chthonolasius
- Species: L. meridionalis

Binomial name
- Lasius meridionalis (Bondroit, 1920)

= Lasius meridionalis =

Species of insect

Lasius meridionalis is a species of ant belonging to the family Formicidae.

It is native to Europe and Japan.
