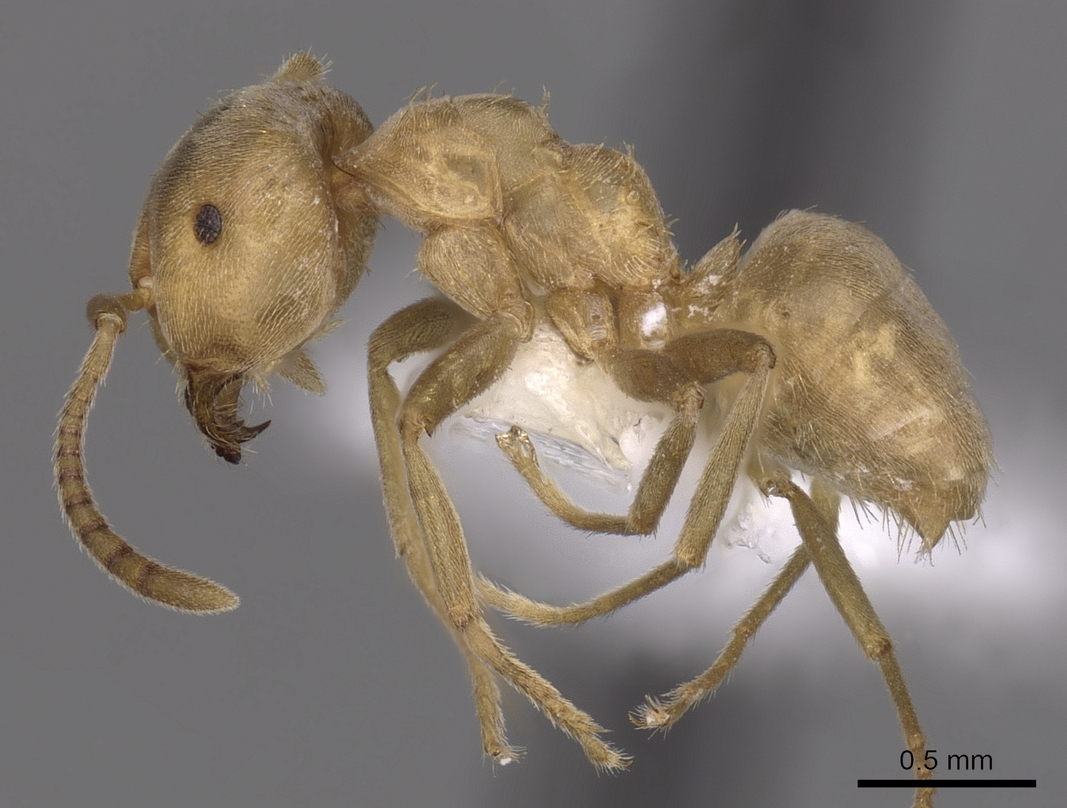

Scientific classification
- Domain: Eukaryota
- Kingdom: Animalia
- Phylum: Arthropoda
- Class: Insecta
- Order: Hymenoptera
- Family: Formicidae
- Subfamily: Formicinae
- Genus: Lasius
- Species: L. carniolicus

Binomial name
- Lasius carniolicus Mayr, 1861

= Lasius carniolicus =

Species of insect

Lasius carniolicus is a species of ant belonging to the family Formicidae.

It is native to Europe.
