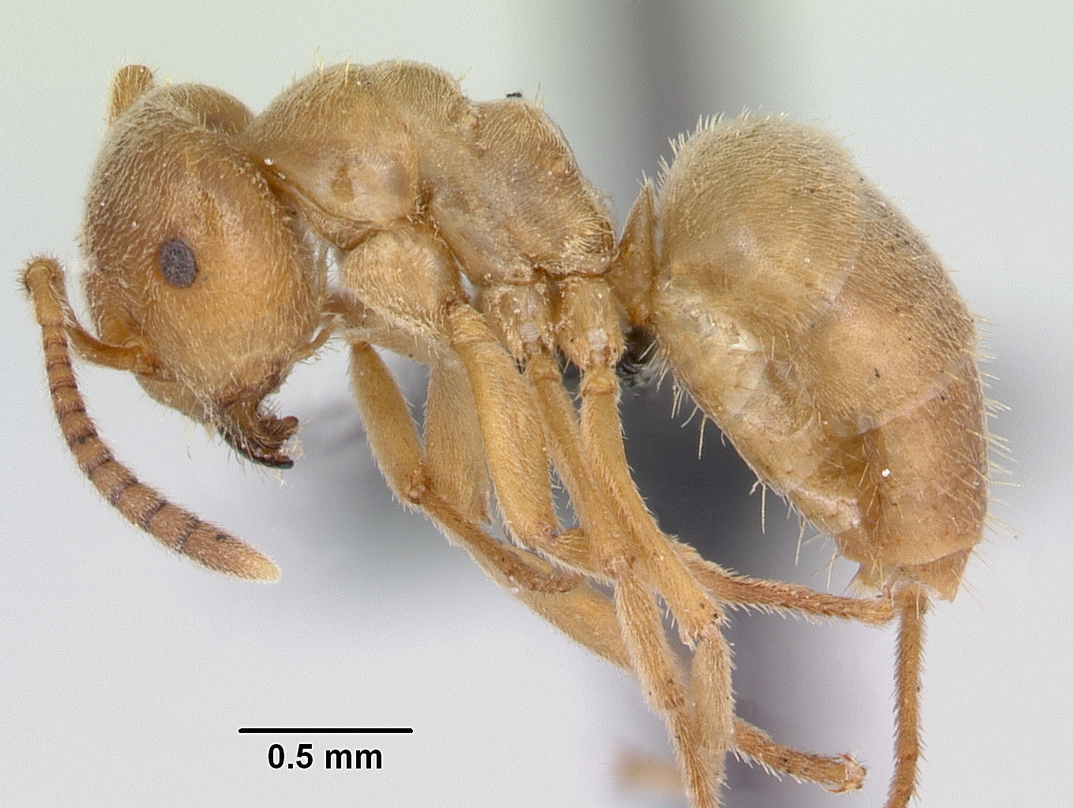

Scientific classification
- Domain: Eukaryota
- Kingdom: Animalia
- Phylum: Arthropoda
- Class: Insecta
- Order: Hymenoptera
- Family: Formicidae
- Subfamily: Formicinae
- Genus: Lasius
- Species: L. sabularum

Binomial name
- Lasius sabularum (Bondroit, 1918)

= Lasius sabularum =

Species of insect

Lasius sabularum is a species of ant in the subfamily Formicinae native to Europe.
