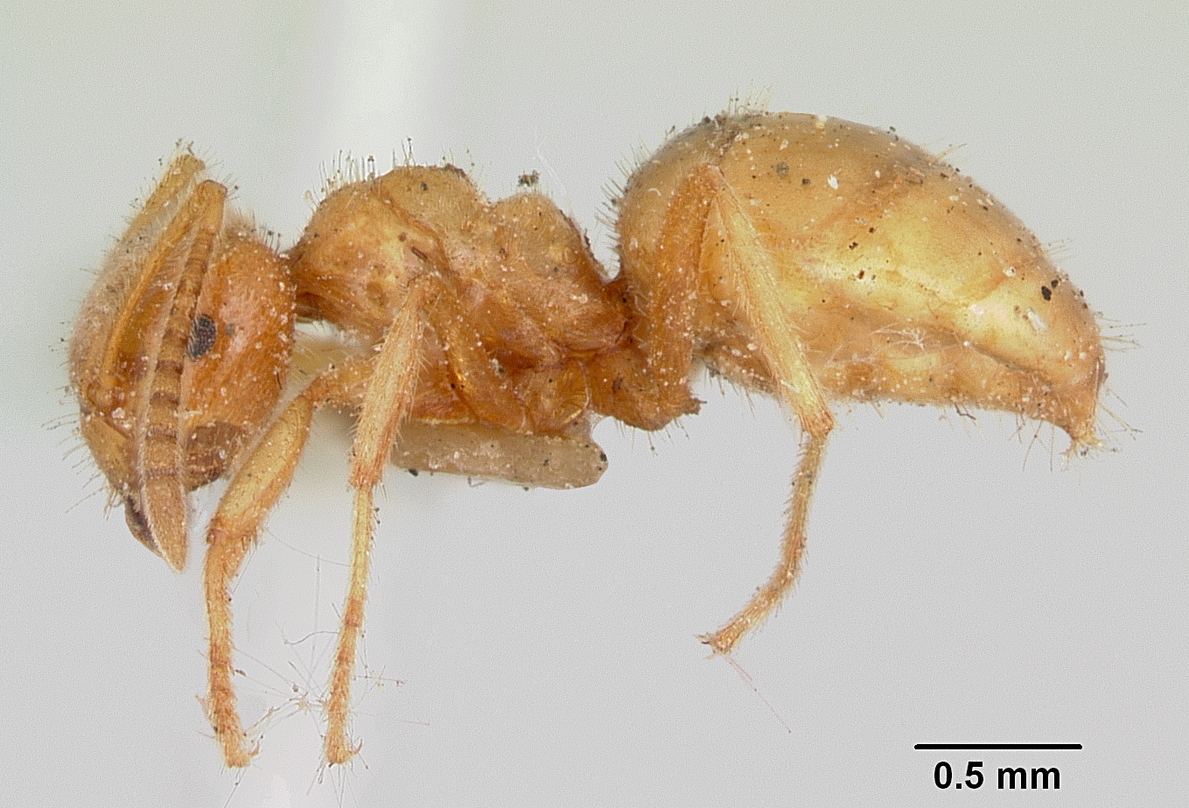

Scientific classification
- Kingdom: Animalia
- Phylum: Arthropoda
- Clade: Pancrustacea
- Class: Insecta
- Order: Hymenoptera
- Family: Formicidae
- Subfamily: Formicinae
- Tribe: Lasiini
- Genus: Lasius
- Species: L. speculiventris

Binomial name
- Lasius speculiventris Emery, 1983

= Lasius speculiventris =

Species of ant

Lasius speculiventris is a species of ant that is commonly found in the northern United States and lives in forests, woodlands, and meadows.
