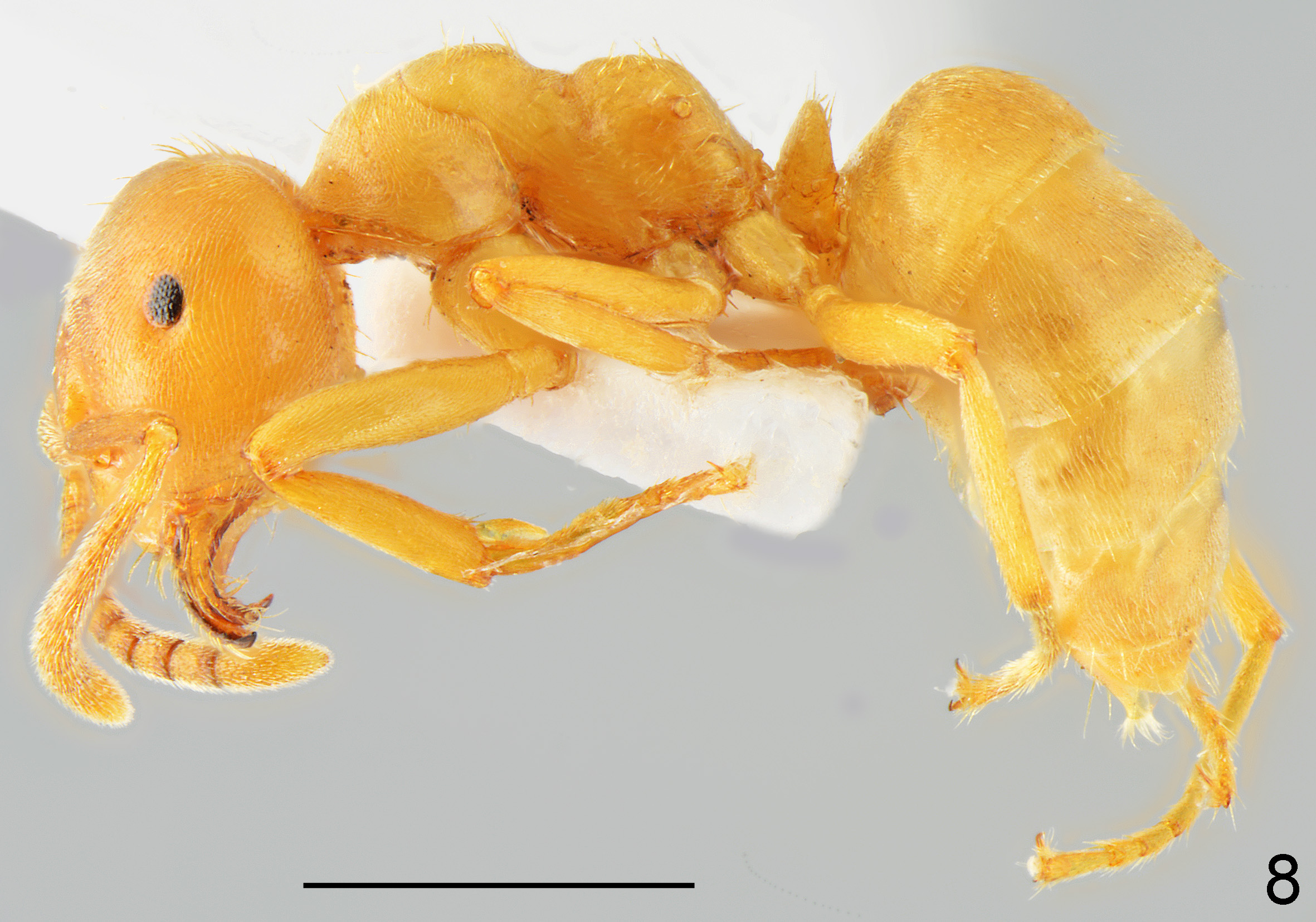

Conservation status
- Vulnerable (IUCN 2.3)

Scientific classification
- Kingdom: Animalia
- Phylum: Arthropoda
- Clade: Pancrustacea
- Class: Insecta
- Order: Hymenoptera
- Family: Formicidae
- Subfamily: Formicinae
- Genus: Lasius
- Species: L. reginae

Binomial name
- Lasius reginae Faber, 1967

= Lasius reginae =

Species of ant

Lasius reginae is a species of ant in the genus Lasius. It is native to Austria.
