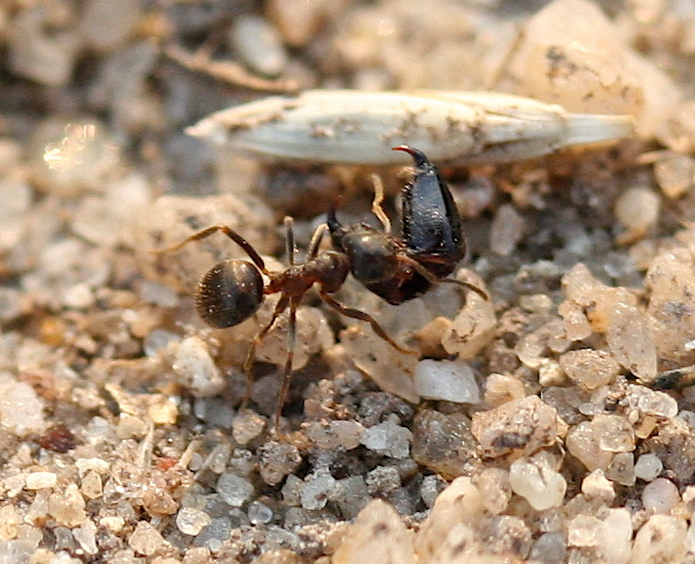

Scientific classification
- Domain: Eukaryota
- Kingdom: Animalia
- Phylum: Arthropoda
- Class: Insecta
- Order: Hymenoptera
- Family: Formicidae
- Subfamily: Formicinae
- Genus: Lasius
- Species: L. japonicus

Binomial name
- Lasius japonicus Santschi, 1941

= Lasius japonicus =

Species of ant

Lasius japonicus is a species of ant belonging to the genus Lasius, that are commonly found throughout East Asia. The species has been observed spraying formic acid both defensively and offensively. It is also known to tend to aphids in exchange for their honeydew secretions, and have been found to be far more attentive to their aphids then other similar ant species. In appearance they are mostly black in color with a tinge of white on their gaster.
