= Lasius coloradensis =

Scientific classification
- Domain: Eukaryota
- Kingdom: Animalia
- Phylum: Arthropoda
- Class: Insecta
- Order: Hymenoptera
- Family: Formicidae
- Subfamily: Formicinae
- Genus: Lasius
- Species: L. coloradensis

Binomial name
- Lasius coloradensis Wheeler, 1917

Species of ant

Lasius coloradensis is a species of ant belonging to the genus Lasius, formerly a part of the genus (now a subgenus) Acanthomyops. Described in 1917 by Wheeler, the species is native to the United States. The queens of will make a claustral chamber and hibernate, laying eggs in the spring.
