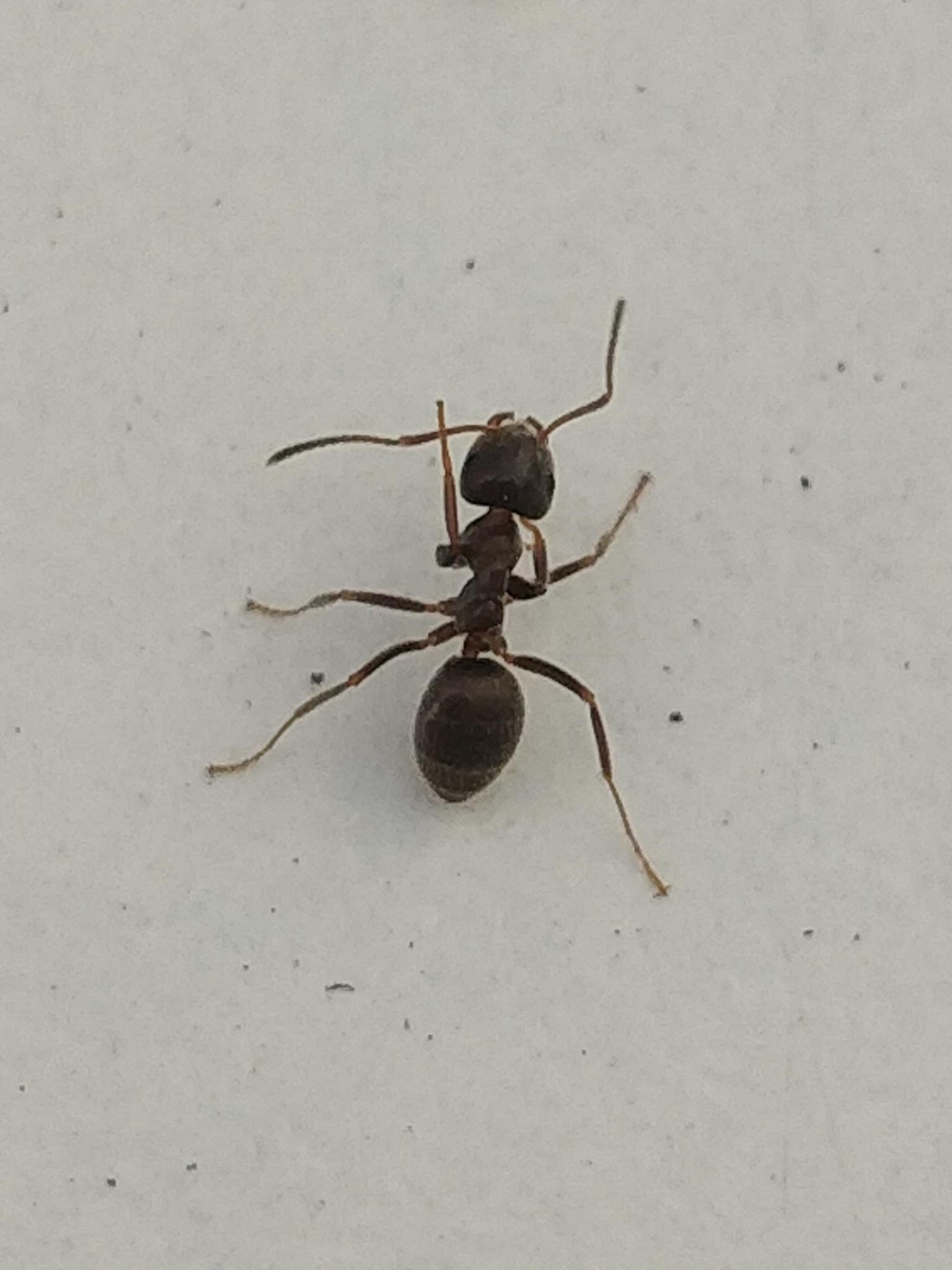

Scientific classification
- Domain: Eukaryota
- Kingdom: Animalia
- Phylum: Arthropoda
- Class: Insecta
- Order: Hymenoptera
- Family: Formicidae
- Subfamily: Formicinae
- Genus: Lasius
- Species: L. grandis

Binomial name
- Lasius grandis (Forel, 1909)

= Lasius grandis =

Species of ant

Lasius grandis is a species of ant from the genus Lasius. The species was originally described by Forel in 1909. It occurs in the Mediterranean region of Europe and North Africa, more precisely in the Portuguese and Spanish mainland, in Andorra, the Azores, the Balearic Islands and Canary Islands.
