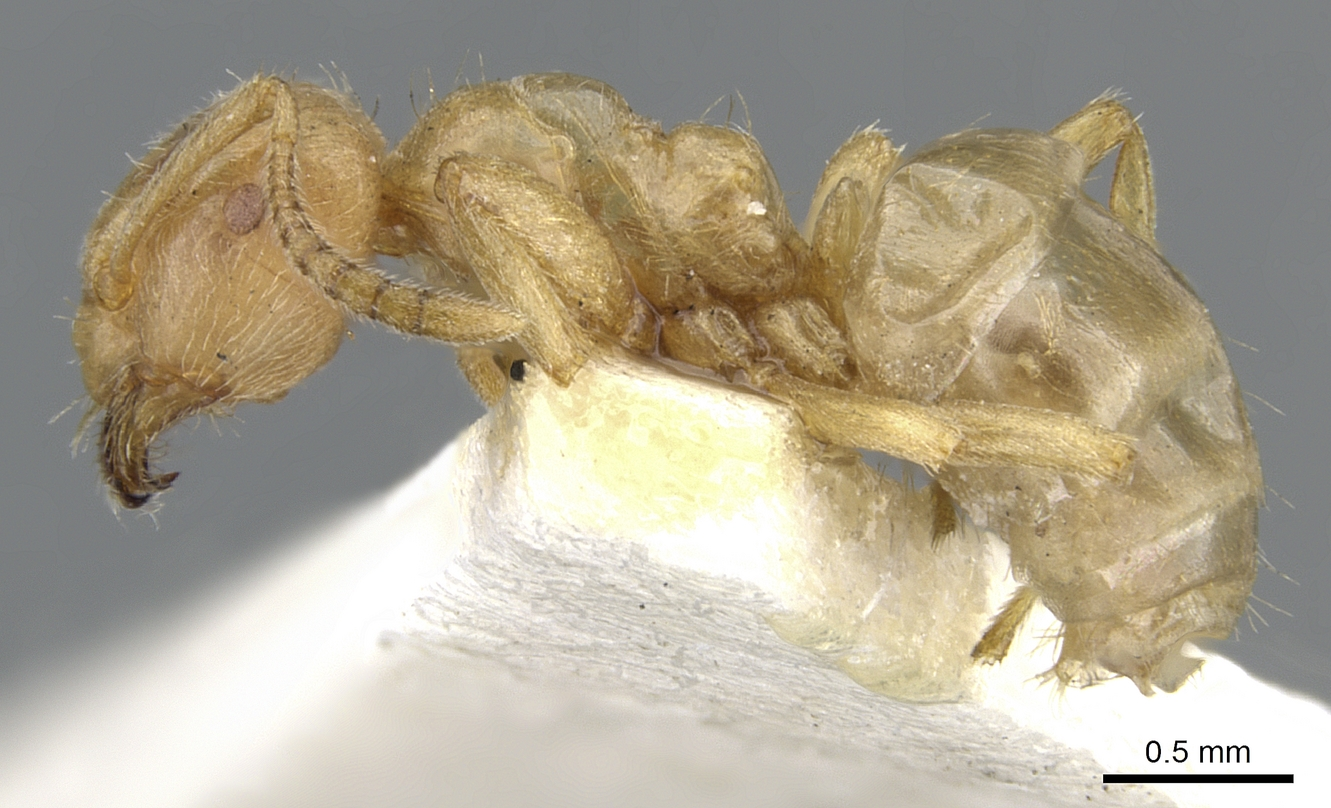

Scientific classification
- Kingdom: Animalia
- Phylum: Arthropoda
- Clade: Pancrustacea
- Class: Insecta
- Order: Hymenoptera
- Family: Formicidae
- Subfamily: Formicinae
- Genus: Lasius
- Subgenus: Acanthomyops
- Species: L. mexicanus

Binomial name
- Lasius mexicanus Wheeler, 1914

= Lasius mexicanus =

Species of ant

Lasius mexicanus is a species of ant belonging to the genus Lasius, formerly a part of the genus (now a subgenus) Acanthomyops. Described in 1914 by William Morton Wheeler, the species is native to Mexico.
