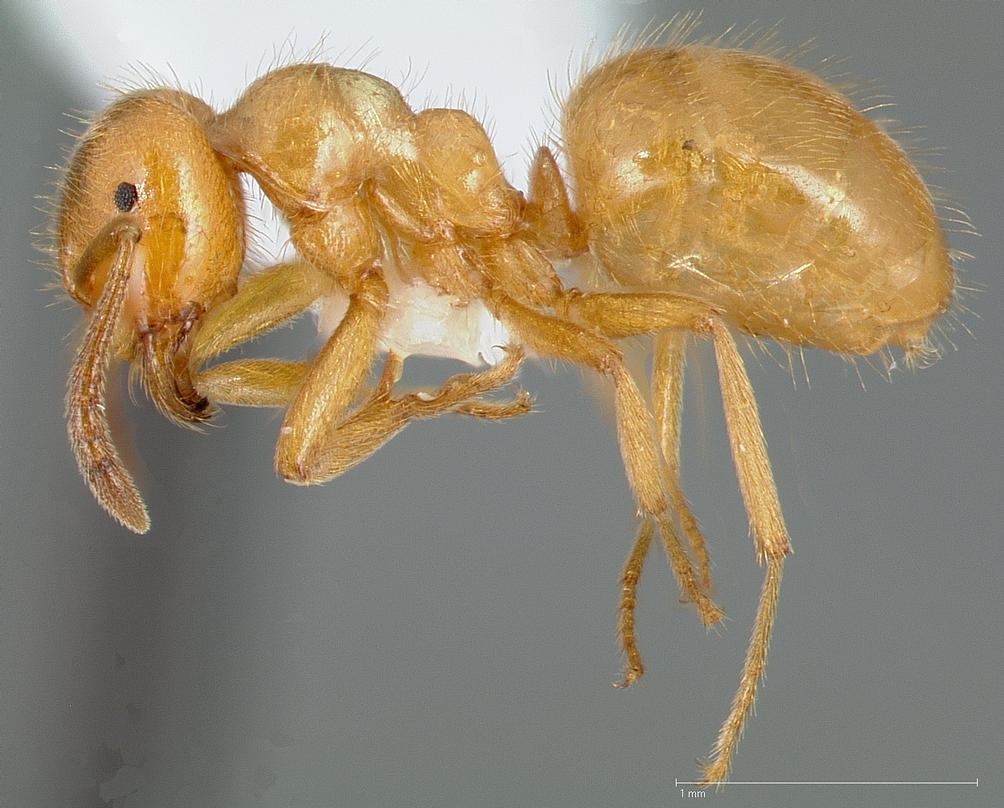
- Lasius latipes worker

Conservation status
- Vulnerable (IUCN 2.3)

Scientific classification
- Domain: Eukaryota
- Kingdom: Animalia
- Phylum: Arthropoda
- Class: Insecta
- Order: Hymenoptera
- Family: Formicidae
- Subfamily: Formicinae
- Genus: Lasius
- Species: L. latipes

Binomial name
- Lasius latipes (Walsh, 1863)

= Lasius latipes =

Species of ant

Lasius latipes is a species of ant in the genus Lasius. It is native to the United States. It is a temporary social parasite, which means queens typically invade nests of Lasius neoniger to begin their own colony.
