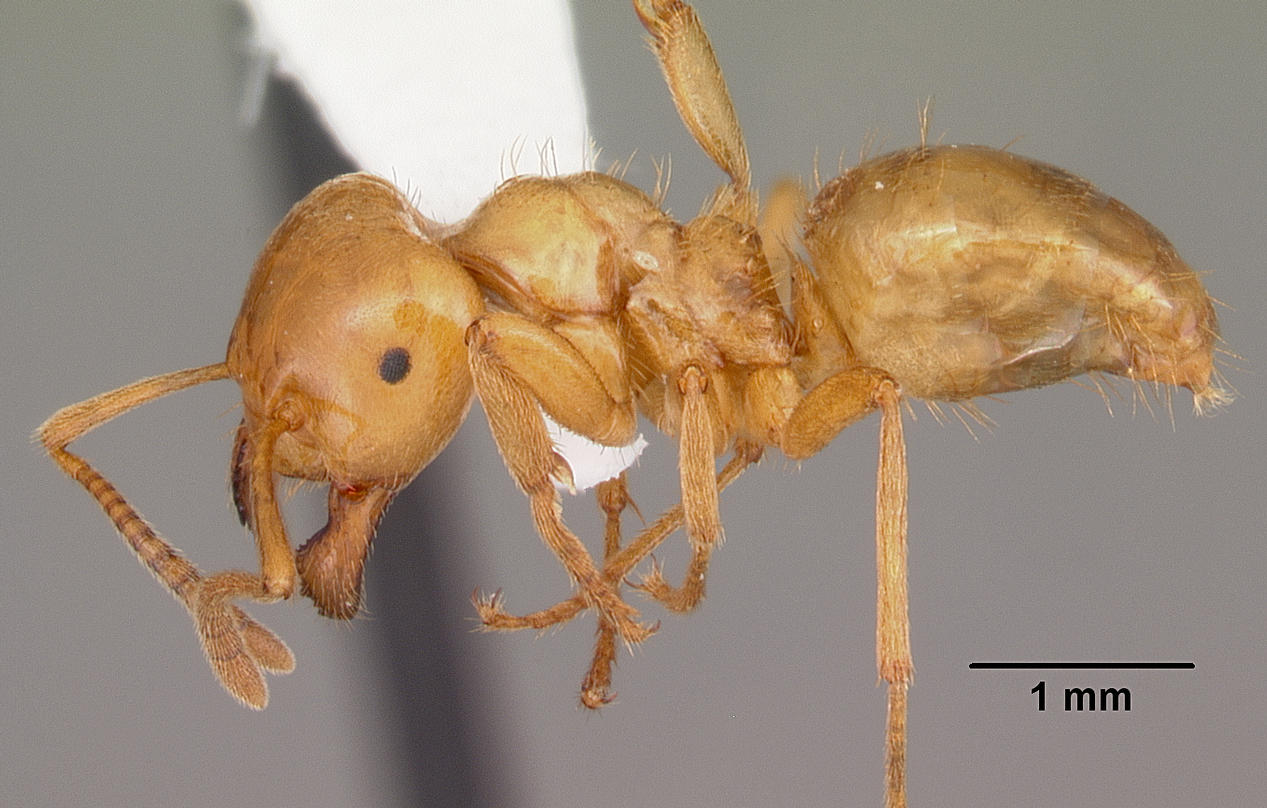
- Lasius interjectus

Scientific classification
- Domain: Eukaryota
- Kingdom: Animalia
- Phylum: Arthropoda
- Class: Insecta
- Order: Hymenoptera
- Family: Formicidae
- Subfamily: Formicinae
- Genus: Lasius
- Species: L. interjectus

Binomial name
- Lasius interjectus Mayr, 1866

= Lasius interjectus =

Larger yellow ant

Species of ant

Lasius interjectus, commonly known as the larger yellow ant, is a species of ant belonging to the genus Lasius, and was formerly a part of the genus (now a subgenus) Acanthomyops. Described in 1866 by Mayr, the species is native to the United States.
