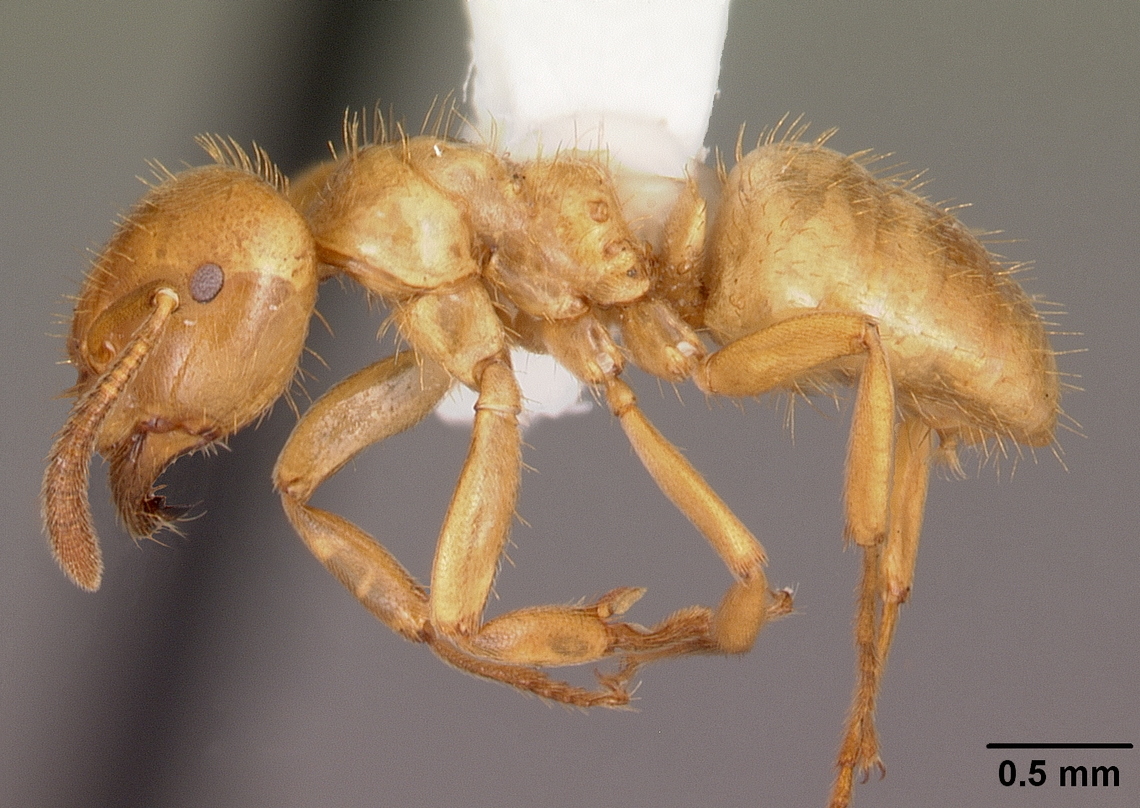
- Lasius claviger worker

Scientific classification
- Kingdom: Animalia
- Phylum: Arthropoda
- Clade: Pancrustacea
- Class: Insecta
- Order: Hymenoptera
- Family: Formicidae
- Subfamily: Formicinae
- Genus: Lasius
- Species: L. claviger

Binomial name
- Lasius claviger Roger, 1862

= Lasius claviger =

Smaller yellow ant

Species of ant

Lasius claviger, the smaller yellow ant or common citronella ant, is a species of ant belonging to the genus Lasius, formerly a part of the genus (now subgenus) Acanthomyops. Described in 1862 by Roger, the species is native to the United States.
