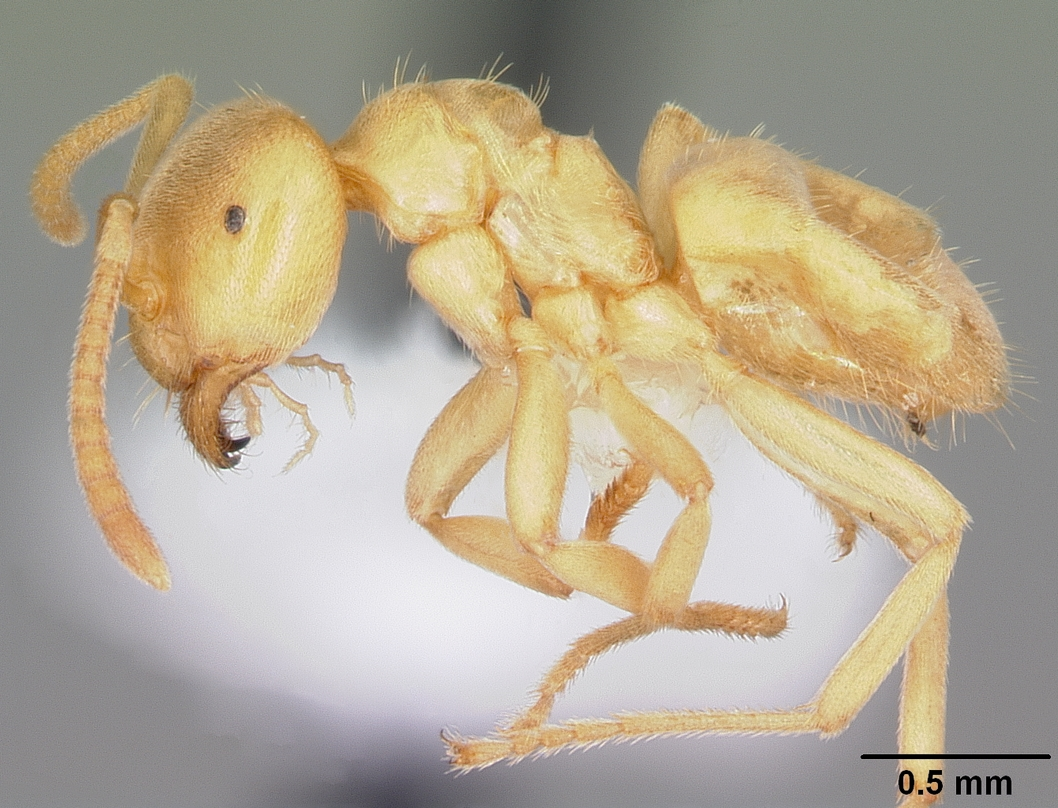

Scientific classification
- Kingdom: Animalia
- Phylum: Arthropoda
- Class: Insecta
- Order: Hymenoptera
- Family: Formicidae
- Subfamily: Formicinae
- Genus: Lasius
- Subgenus: Cautolasius
- Species: L. nearcticus

Binomial name
- Lasius nearcticus Wheeler, 1906

= Lasius nearcticus =

Species of ant

Lasius nearcticus is a species of citronella ant native to the eastern United States and parts of Canada, and possibly parts of western Canada and the western United States.
