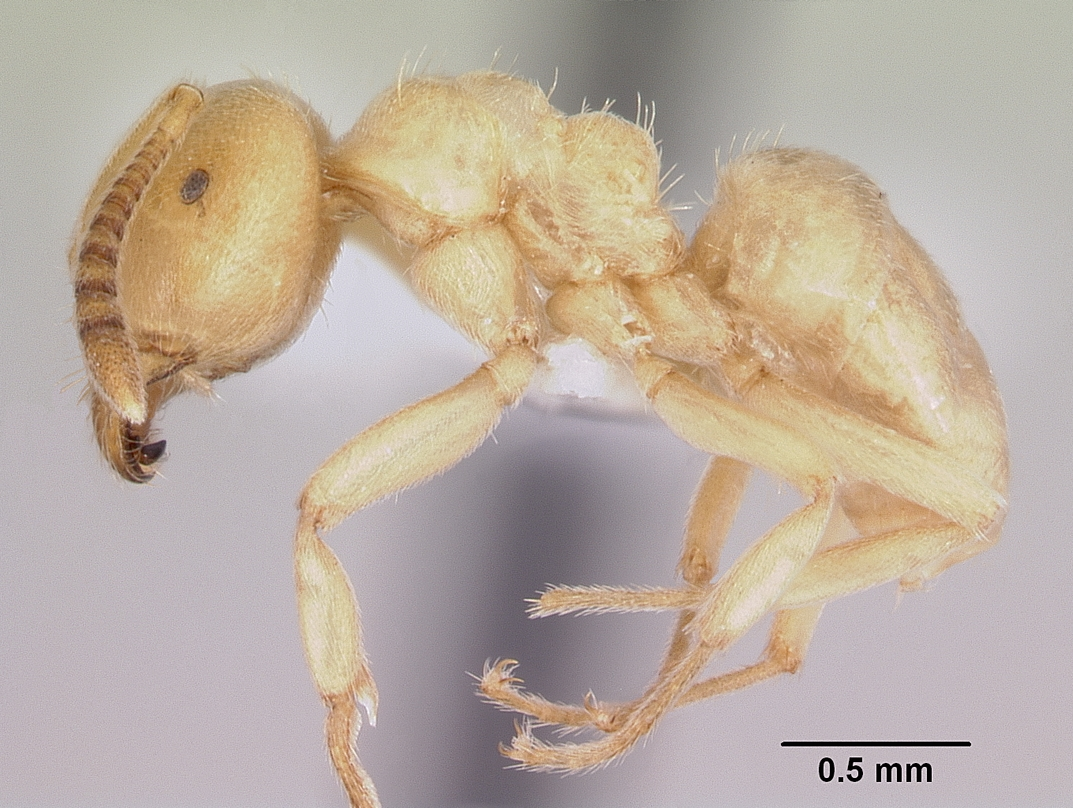
- Lasius subglaber worker

Scientific classification
- Domain: Eukaryota
- Kingdom: Animalia
- Phylum: Arthropoda
- Class: Insecta
- Order: Hymenoptera
- Family: Formicidae
- Subfamily: Formicinae
- Genus: Lasius
- Species: L. subglaber

Binomial name
- Lasius subglaber Emery, 1893

= Lasius subglaber =

Species of ant

Lasius subglaber is a species of ant belonging to the genus Lasius, formerly a part of the genus (now a subgenus) Acanthomyops. Described in 1893 by Emery, the species is native to the United States and Canada.
