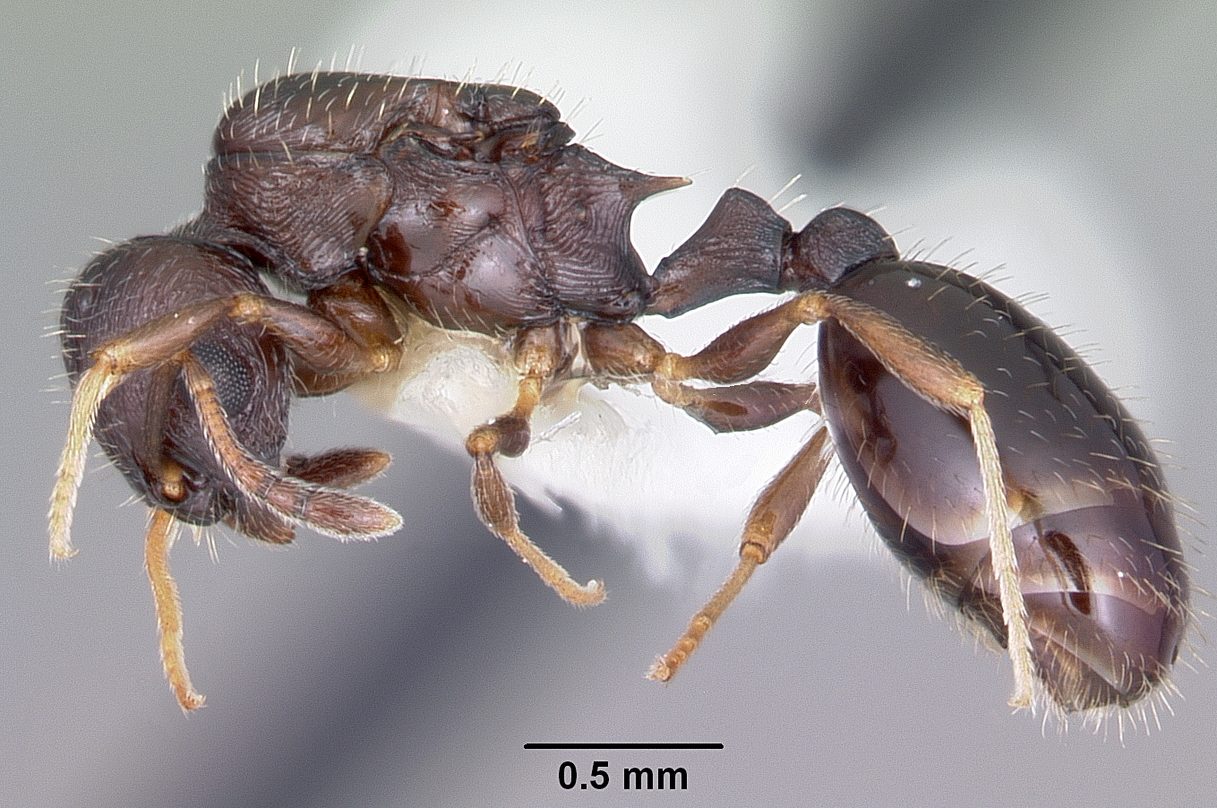
- Mounted queen of L. longispinosus

Scientific classification
- Domain: Eukaryota
- Kingdom: Animalia
- Phylum: Arthropoda
- Class: Insecta
- Order: Hymenoptera
- Family: Formicidae
- Subfamily: Myrmicinae
- Genus: Leptothorax
- Species: L. longispinosus

Binomial name
- Leptothorax longispinosus (Roger, 1863)

= Leptothorax longispinosus =

Species of ant

Leptothorax longispinosus is an American species of ant.

== Description ==
Leptothorax longispinosus are yellowish, with well-separated propodial spines.
