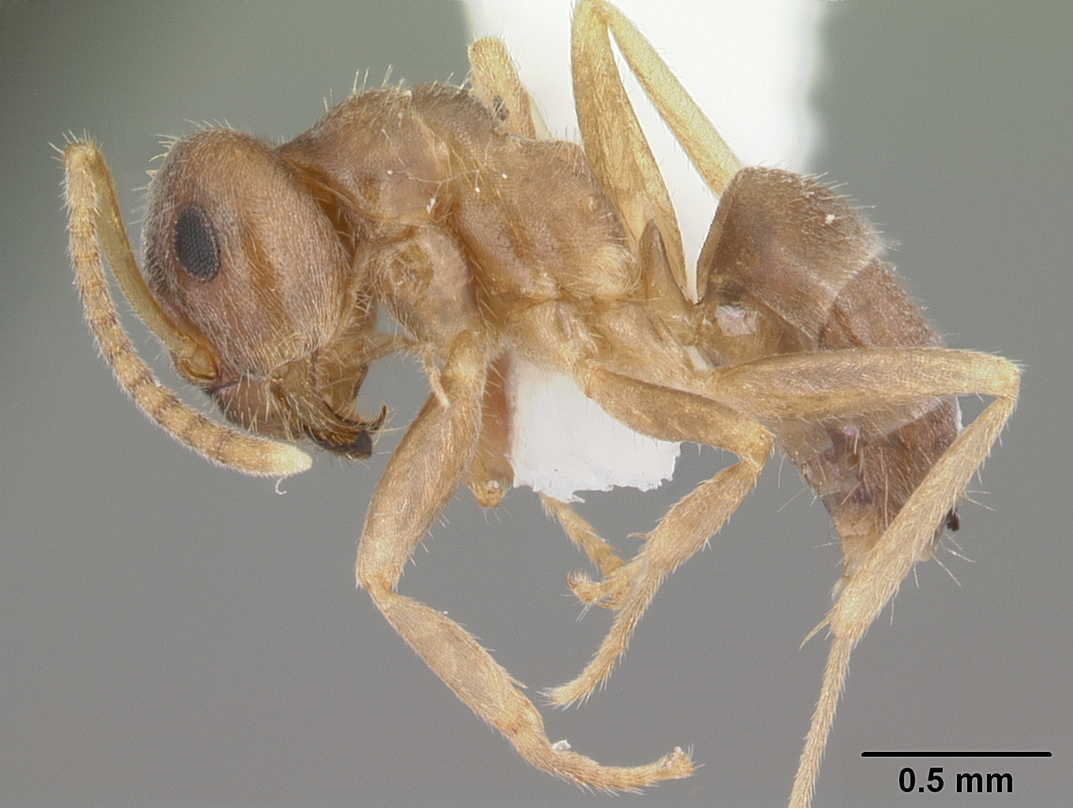
- Lasius neoniger worker

Scientific classification
- Kingdom: Animalia
- Phylum: Arthropoda
- Clade: Pancrustacea
- Class: Insecta
- Order: Hymenoptera
- Family: Formicidae
- Subfamily: Formicinae
- Genus: Lasius
- Subgenus: Lasius
- Species: L. neoniger

Binomial name
- Lasius neoniger Emery, 1893

= Lasius neoniger =

Species of ant

Lasius neoniger, also known as the turfgrass ant, Labour day ant, cornfield ant or nuisance ant, is a species of ant in the genus Lasius. Found in North America, the species is common in the eastern United States and Canada, though they can be found all over the continent. They are usually light brown in color, with a slightly darker head.

== Biology ==
Lasius neoniger are relatively small ants who prefer to nest in open habitats, including lawns and sidewalks. Colonies of these ants are monogynous and are unwilling to accept other queens or merge with other colonies of the same species. They are one of the many species of ants who tend aphids, who provide the ants with a regular source of sugar and occasionally protein.

Colonies have a nuptial flight around the beginning of September, near Labour Day. The new queens will dig a claustral chamber and hibernate for the winter before starting their new colony the following spring.

== Ecological impact ==
Due to their preference for open habitats, Lasius neoniger are one of the first species of ants to move into disturbed areas. The building of their nests triples soil respiration and increases biodiversity in the area by encouraging other insects to move in. This in turn has a trickle down effect as the new insects attract other animals and plants.
