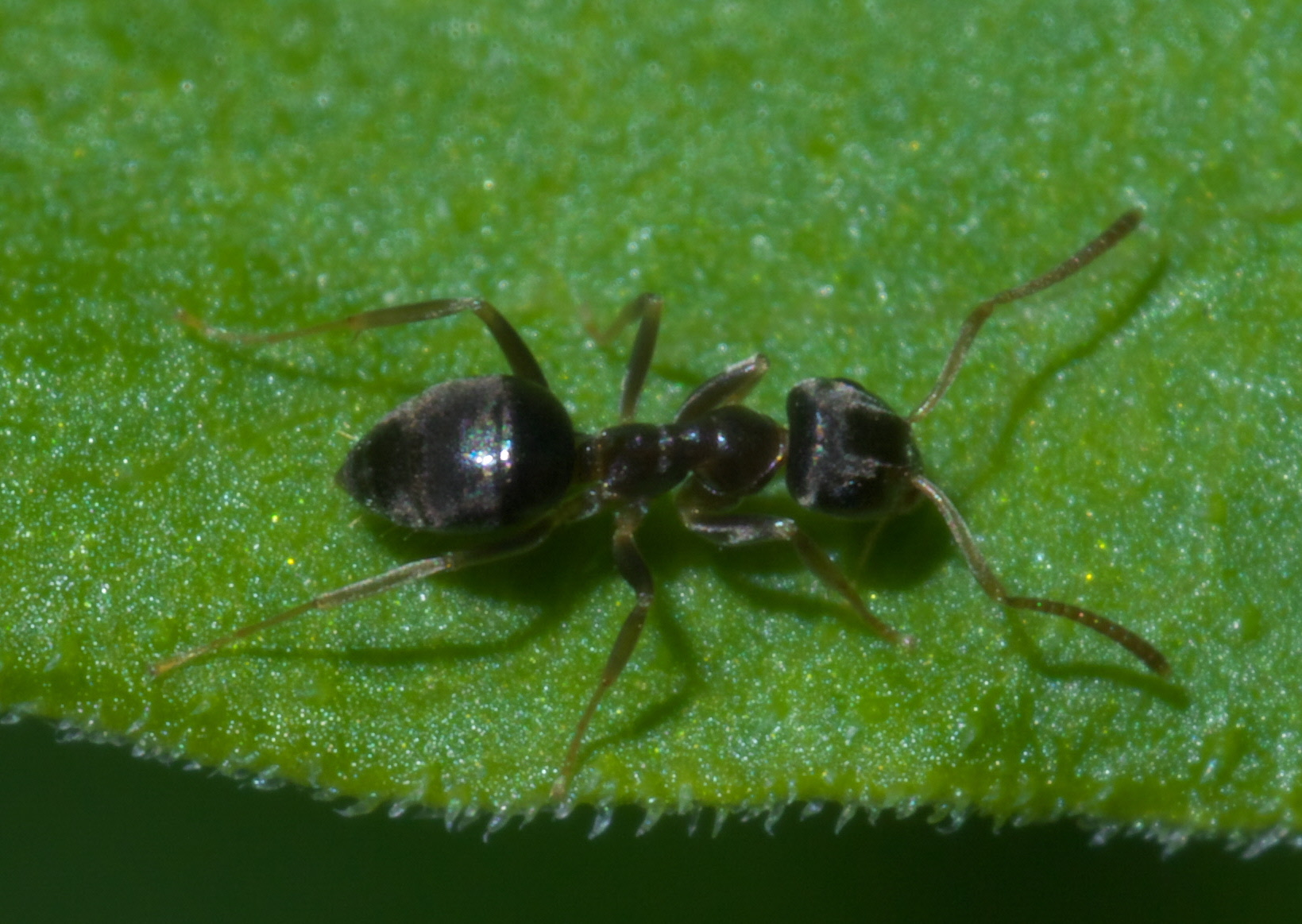
- Lasius americanus worker

Scientific classification
- Kingdom: Animalia
- Phylum: Arthropoda
- Class: Insecta
- Order: Hymenoptera
- Family: Formicidae
- Subfamily: Formicinae
- Tribe: Lasiini; Ashmead, 1905

= Lasiini =

Tribe of ants

Lasiini is a tribe of ants in the subfamily Formicinae. There are about 10 genera and more than 450 described species in Lasiini.

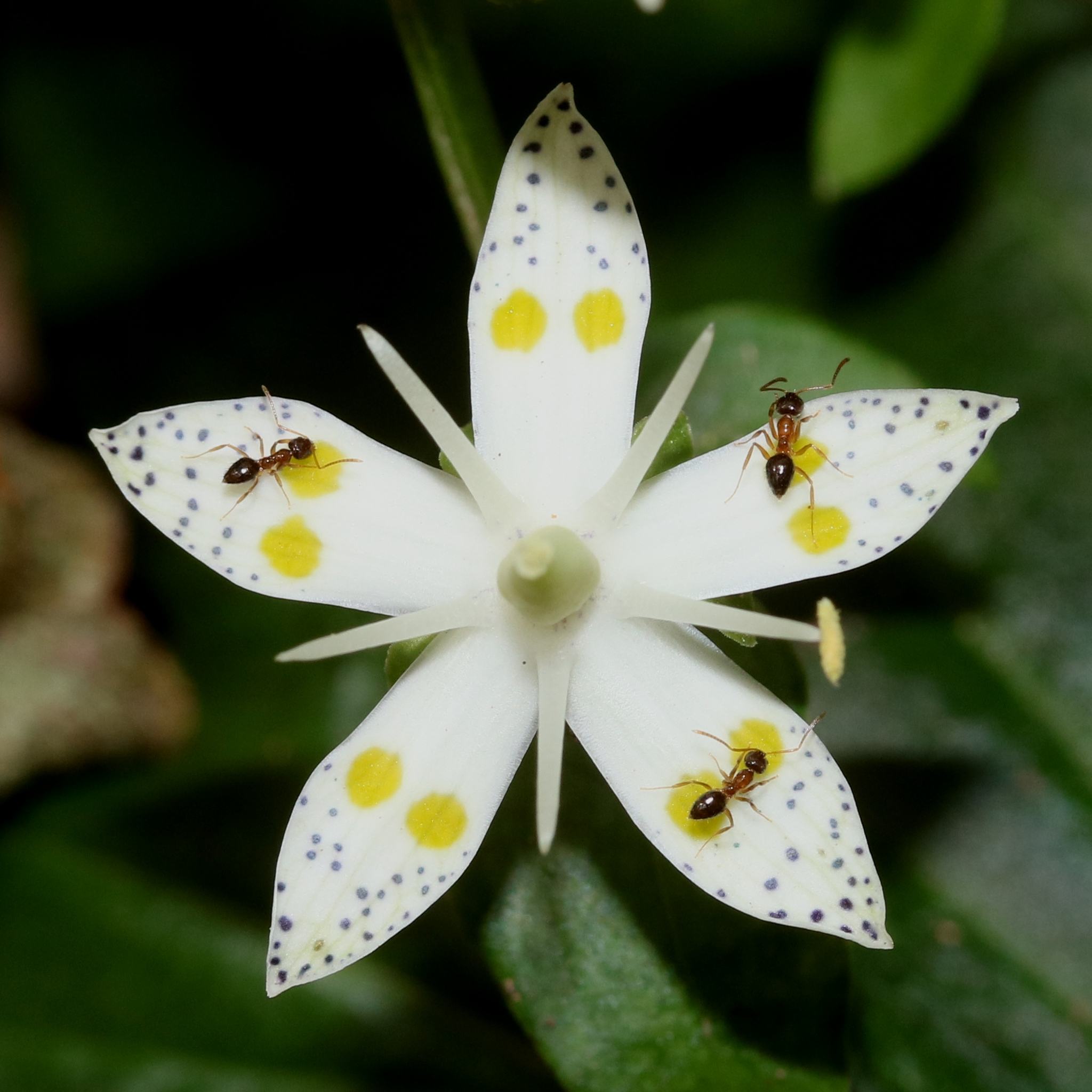
Nylanderia flavipes

== Genera ==
These genera belong to the tribe Lasiini:

=== Extant ===
- Cladomyrma Wheeler, 1920
- Euprenolepis Emery, 1906
- Lasius Fabricius, 1804
- Metalasius Boudinot et al., 2022
- Myrmecocystus Wesmael, 1838
- Nylanderia Emery, 1906
- Paraparatrechina Donisthorpe, 1947
- Paratrechina Motschoulsky, 1863
- Prenolepis Mayr, 1861
- Pseudolasius Emery, 1887
- Zatania LaPolla et al., 2012

=== Extinct ===
- †Drymomyrmex Wheeler, 1915
