= Rescue behaviour =

Altruistic behaviour in animals

Rescue behaviour is a form of altruistic behaviour shown by animals where an individual in distress is aided appropriately by another individual which puts itself at risk in the process. The term "rescue behaviour" was first introduced in the title and in the text of a paper by Wojciech Czechowski, Ewa Joanna Godzińska and Marek Kozłowski (2002) that reported the results of field observations and experiments documenting this behaviour in workers of three ant species, Formica sanguinea, Formica fusca and Formica cinerea that were observed to try to rescue individuals captured by antlion larvae (Myrmeleon formicarius). Criteria allowing to tell apart rescue behaviour from other forms of cooperation and altruism were subsequently provided by Elise Nowbahari and Karen L. Hollis.

Rescue behaviour has been demonstrated in a very limited range of animals that include ants, primates including humans, a few bird species, such as the Australian magpie, and wild boar.
