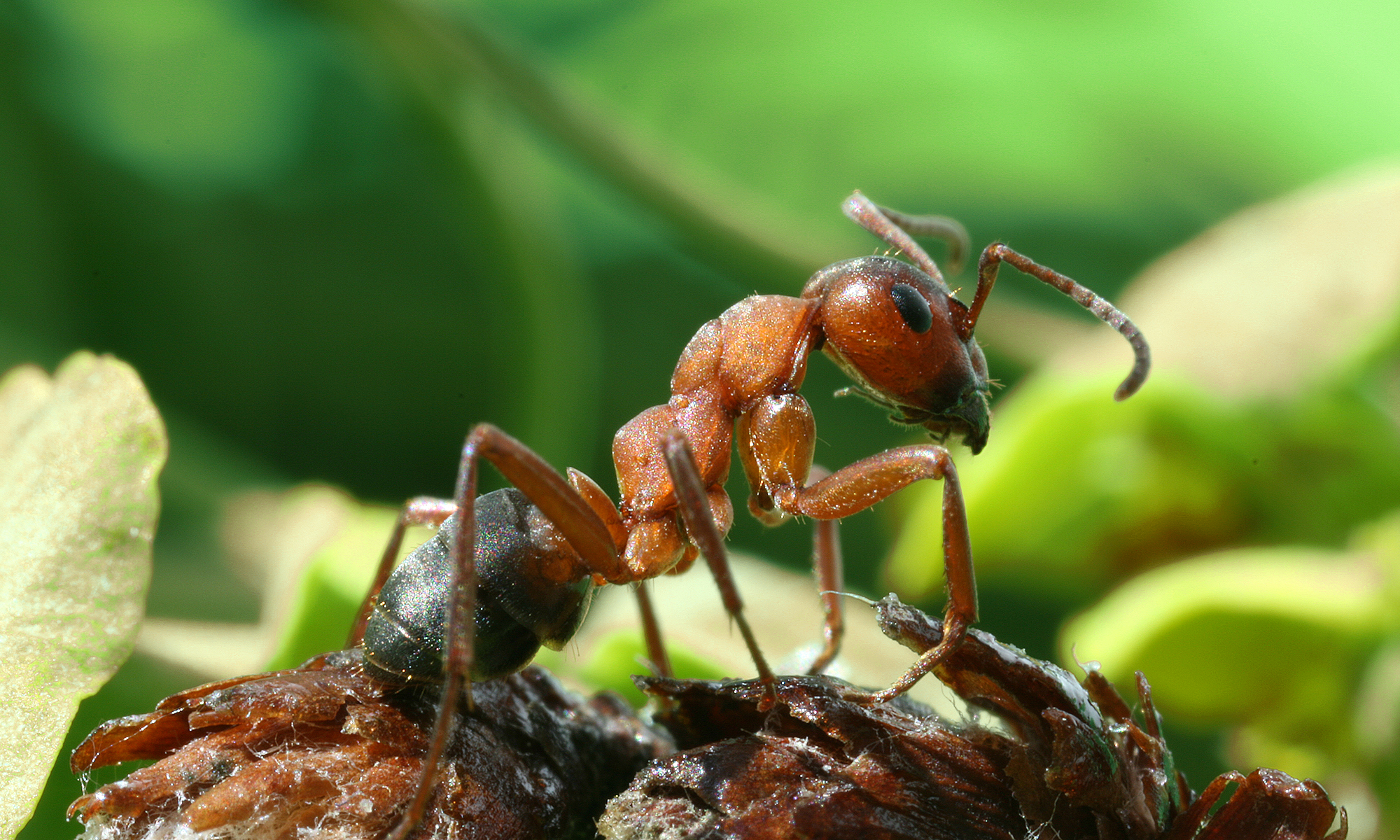
- Formica rufa worker
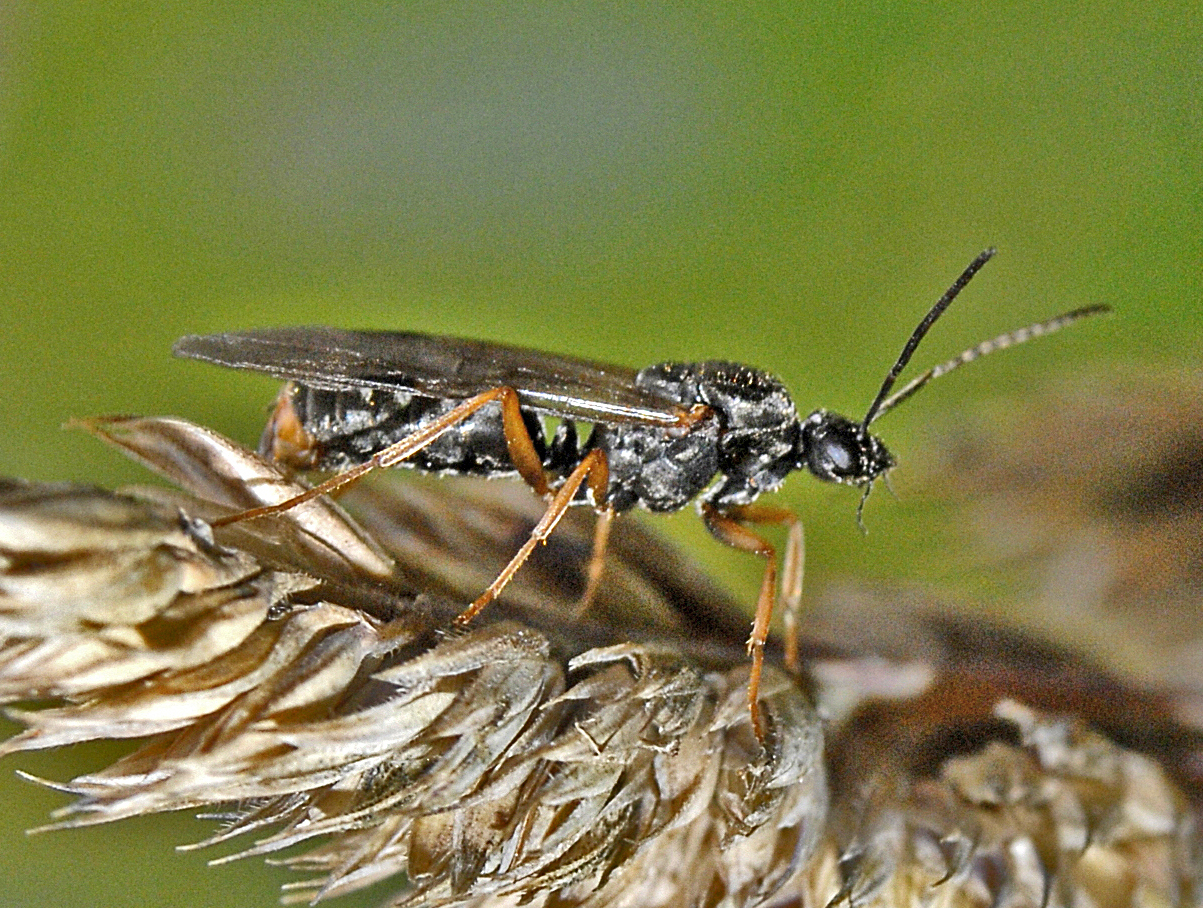
- Formica rufa group winged male

Scientific classification
- Kingdom: Animalia
- Phylum: Arthropoda
- Clade: Pancrustacea
- Class: Insecta
- Order: Hymenoptera
- Family: Formicidae
- Subfamily: Formicinae
- Genus: Formica
- Species group: Formica rufa species group

Species
- (see text)

= Formica rufa species group =

Group of ants

The Formica rufa group is a subgeneric group within the genus Formica, first proposed by William Morton Wheeler. This group contains the mound-building species of Formica commonly termed "wood ants" or "thatch-mound ants", which build prominent nests consisting of a mound of grass, litter, or conifer needles. The species Formica rufa or the red wood ant is the type species of this subgroup.

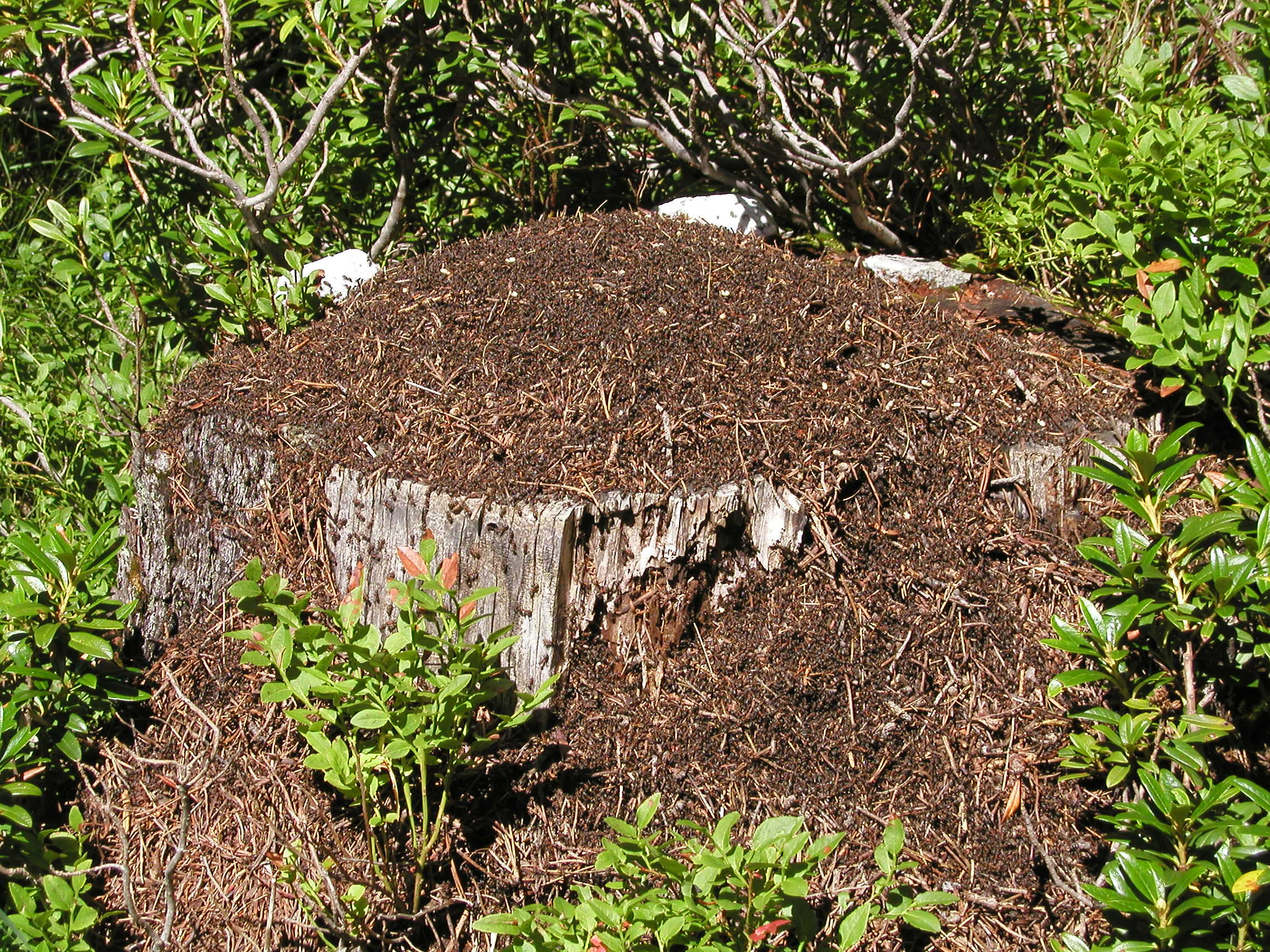
Typical Formica thatch mound made of forest litter on rotten stump, covered by worker ants going out to forage

This particular group can inhabit open deciduous woodlands, dense pine forests, and even moorland. Workers vary in size, the largest reaching about 10 millimetres (0.39 in) long. They can produce formic acid in their abdomens and eject it 12 centimetres (4.7 in) in the air when threatened. The only function of males is to mate in flight with queens. Species previously attributed to the Microgyna group were transferred to the F. rufa group by the Wheelers in 1986.

== Colonies ==
The genetic relationships in F. rufa group colonies can be complex. Colonies can be polygynous (having multiple queens) and these are often polydomous (having multiple nests per colony). Queens may be singly or multiply mated, and in polygynous colonies, may or may not be related. Colonies are rarely, if ever, independently formed. They either bud off from existing colonies, or are formed by temporary social parasitism of colonies of F. fusca or other closely related species. A wood ant queen ousts the existing queen, lays eggs, and the F. fusca workers raise her offspring until the nest is taken over. Some species in the F. rufa group sometimes form enormous "supercolonies" consisting of hundreds or thousands of nests. The largest documented example is an F. yessensis colony in Japan covering 2.7 square kilometres (1.0 sq mi) containing an estimated 306 million workers and 1 million queens.

== Member species ==
European species include:

- Formica aquilonia Yarrow, 1955
- Formica lugubris Zetterstedt, 1838
- Formica paralugubris Seifert, 1996
- Formica polyctena Förster, 1850
- Formica pratensis Retzius, 1783
- Formica rufa Linnaeus, 1761
- Formica truncorum Fabricius, 1804

Asian species include:

- Formica yessensis

== See also ==
- Pissant
