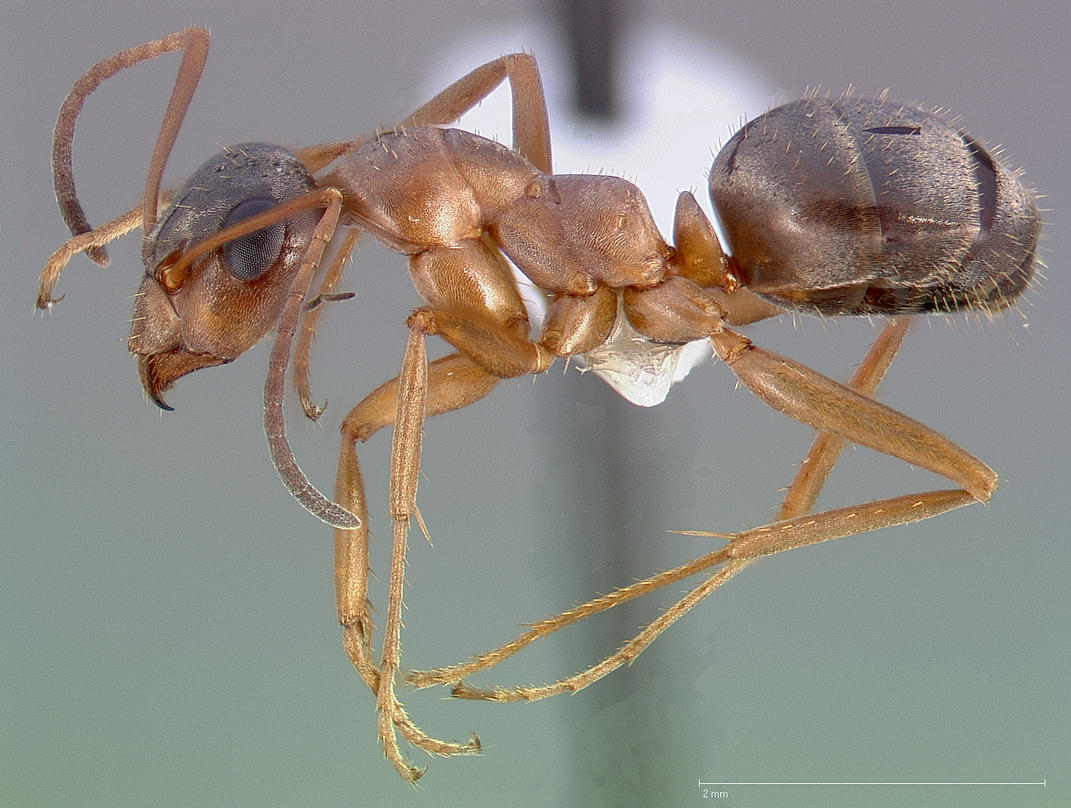
- F. pacifica worker from United States

Scientific classification
- Kingdom: Animalia
- Phylum: Arthropoda
- Class: Insecta
- Order: Hymenoptera
- Family: Formicidae
- Subfamily: Formicinae
- Genus: Formica
- Species: F. pacifica

Binomial name
- Formica pacifica Francoeur, 1973

= Formica pacifica =

Species of ant

Formica pacifica is an ant species occupying the Pacific Coast of the United States and British Columbia, Canada. This species is a member of the Formica fusca species group. Workers are quite fast and aggressive. This species engages in wars with neighboring colonies. F. pacifica is present in both forests and human settlements. Colonies of this species can grow up to a few thousand workers.

== Reproduction ==
Mature colonies take nuptial flights in mid-June to late August. Fertile dealate queens sometimes do not begin the egg-laying process until after their first hibernation.

== Nesting ==
This species prefers to build their nests in soil under rocks or other firm objects. Nest entrances can be quiet and unnoticeable, while some are marked with the soil or excavated objects from their nest.
