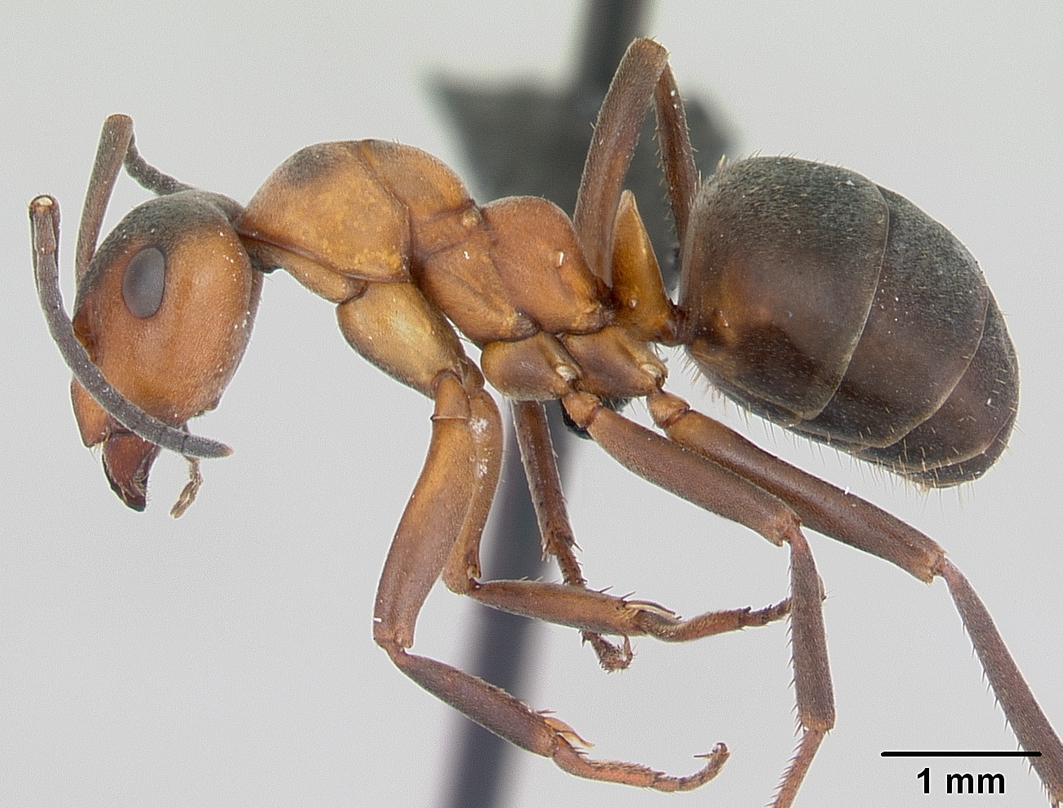
- F. aquilonia worker

Conservation status
- Near Threatened (IUCN 2.3)

Scientific classification
- Domain: Eukaryota
- Kingdom: Animalia
- Phylum: Arthropoda
- Class: Insecta
- Order: Hymenoptera
- Family: Formicidae
- Subfamily: Formicinae
- Genus: Formica
- Species: F. aquilonia

Binomial name
- Formica aquilonia Yarrow, 1955

= Formica aquilonia =

Species of ant

Formica aquilonia, also called the Scottish wood ant, is a species of wood ant of the genus Formica which are widely distributed in Europe and Asia, occurring from Scandinavia in the north to Bulgaria and Italy in the south, and from the UK eastwards through France and Germany to Russia, while they are also found in the coastal areas of the Sea of Okhotsk in eastern Siberia. They live mainly in coniferous forests but they do also occur in some deciduous woodlands.

== Description ==
The Scottish wood ant has a reddish-brown head and thorax and a black abdomen. At the back of the head is a short fringe of hairs but this does not extend as far as the eyes. This ant has fewer, shorter hairs than are present in the other wood ant species found in Britain.

== Distribution ==
The Scottish wood ant has a wide distribution across northern Europe, its range extending from Scandinavia to Siberia. It also occurs in the cooler parts of mountainous regions of central Europe and Asia. In Scotland it occurs in the pinewoods of the Caledonian Forest and throughout the Highlands, including the Isle of Skye off the west coast. It is also known from two locations in County Armagh in Northern Ireland. It is generally found in coniferous forests, including clearings and rides, and in suitable plantations.

== Behaviour ==
This species forms very large mound nests. During the day, columns of ants stream out of these, ascending trees and linking the nests to others in the vicinity. Foraging ants collect honeydew from plant-sucking insects among the tree foliage and bring it back to the nest. They will also collect living or dead invertebrates to supplement this. Winged reproductives are produced in summer, and new nests are also founded by fission from a parent nest, which may contain a number of queens.

== Conservation status ==
Formica aquilonia is included on the International Union for Conservation of Nature's (IUCN) Red List of threatened species, where they are classified as Lower Risk. Because of concerns about their future here, the species is the subject of Species Action Plans, as part of the UK's strategy for protecting biological diversity. Because of the rarity of this ant in Northern Ireland, it is listed as a Northern Ireland Priority Species.

== See also ==
- Formica exsectoides
