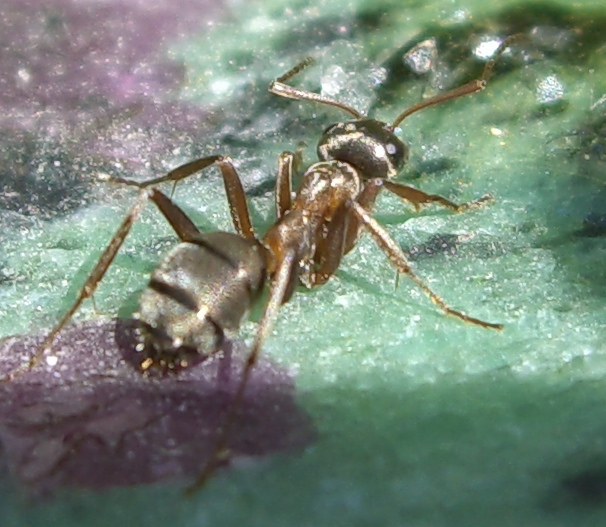

Scientific classification
- Kingdom: Animalia
- Phylum: Arthropoda
- Class: Insecta
- Order: Hymenoptera
- Family: Formicidae
- Subfamily: Formicinae
- Genus: Formica
- Species: F. sanguinea

Binomial name
- Formica sanguinea Latreille, 1798

= Formica sanguinea =

Species of ant

Formica sanguinea, or blood-red ant, is a species of facultative slave-maker ant in the genus Formica characterized by the ability to secrete formic acid. It ranges from Central and Northern Europe through Russia to Japan, China, the Korean Peninsula, Africa and also the United States. This species is coloured red and black with workers up to 7 mm long.

A colony of F. sanguinea can live either as a free colony or as a social parasite of Formica species, most commonly Formica fusca, Formica japonica, Formica hayashi and Formica rufibarbis.

== Raiding ==
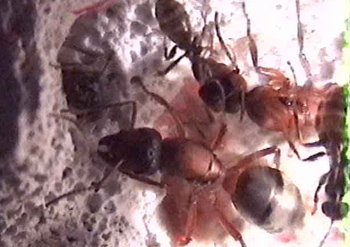
With captured F. fusca

Blood-red ants, F. sanguinea, are facultative slave-makers, meaning colonies can live either alone or be parasitic. This allows them to be a good model organism to study the origins of brood stealing. A fertilized F. sanguinea queen will enter the nest of the host ant species and kill their queen. She then takes advantage of the workers who tend to her and her brood. F. sanguinea workers will also raid nearby nests, stealing larvae and pupae to become future workers for F. sanguinea. The raids are also not exclusively for acquiring new workers but are sometimes predation events.

Formica sanguinea has not been observed to have division of labor in which certain individuals raid or forage. However, some individuals possess more Dufour's gland compounds than others, so presumably would be more successful in during raiding.

Formica sanguinea uses scouting individuals to locate the nest that will be parasitized. Once a nest has been scouted, the raid will happen. The activities that go on during a raid are composed of digging and fighting at the target nest. Both captive workers and blood-red ant raiders are observed to be carrying the brood back to the Formica sanguinea nest. If a member of the colony is killed in the raid, individuals will take that carcass back to the nest to be eaten later. Raids were also never observed on rainy or overcast days. This is thought to be because of the detriment rain might have on terrestrial conditions and the effectiveness of alarm pheromones.

== Chemical defenses ==
F. sanguinea uses formic acid as well as substances in the Dufour's gland as chemical defence. The substances in the Dufour's gland contain hydrocarbons such as hendecane, as well as acetates, decylacetate, and dodecylacetate. Formica sanguinea uses the formic acid and Dufour's gland substances in conjunction with each other. The hydrocarbons in Dufour's substance serve as a wetting before the formic acid is released. Without these wetting agents, formic acid is relatively harmless to other ants. These substances dissolve the fat compounds of the epicuticle as well as enter the tracheal system to kill the opponent.

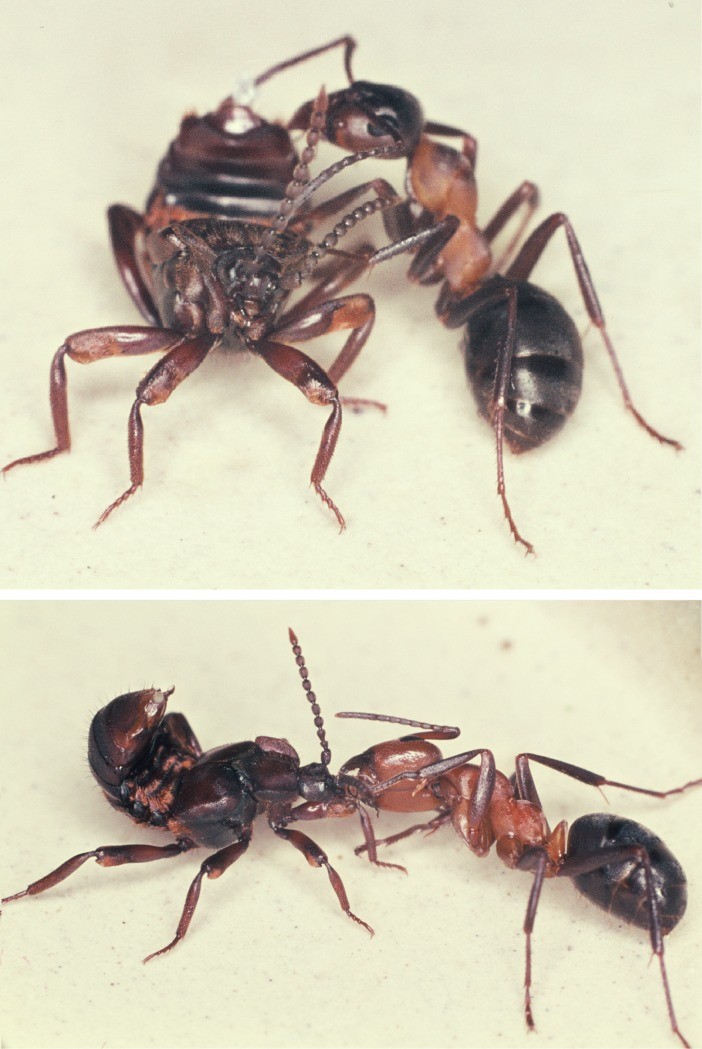
Interactions between Formica sanguinea and Lomechusoides strumosus

== Reproduction ==
Most colonies are monogynous, meaning they have only one queen. F. sanguinea are commonly polyandrous, meaning the singular queen mates with more than one male. In studies observing this, 70% of queens mated with multiple males. F. sanguinea is observed to have higher levels of polyandry than any other Formica species. However, when colonies engage in polygyny, having more than one queen, the rates of polyandry drop. It is assumed that colonies utilize either polyandry or polygyny, to increase the genetic diversity of the colony. Therefore, two different strategies can be employed. One strategy is that a female mates with many males and then disperses to start a new colony. The second strategy is for a female to mate with a fewer number of males, and stay close to the natal colony with other females who have mated with a fewer number of males. In the case of polygyny, it has been observed that there is one dominating queen who is more sexual reproductive than the others. Polyandrous Formica sanguinea colonies show paternity skew, meaning that the mated males offspring are not represented equally in the population. Whether this is because of internal selection or sperm competition is unclear.

== Recognition of individuals ==
Formica sanguinea analyzes hydrocarbons on the cuticle of another individual to determine if it is an intruder. Low intraspecific competition and aggressiveness is observed in this species. When members of the same species of a mixed colony were met with individuals from a pure F. sanguinea colony, they were met with aggressiveness. This is most likely because the identifying hydrocarbons change when individuals are in a mixed colony.

== Evolution ==
Formica sanguinea is one of around 11 species in the Formica genus that display this socially parasitic brood raiding behaviour. Molecular analysis of the genus as a whole indicates that this form of social parasitism evolved just once in the Formica genus, in the common ancestor of the Formica sanguinea group of closely related species. It is estimated that this happened at least 14 million years ago.
