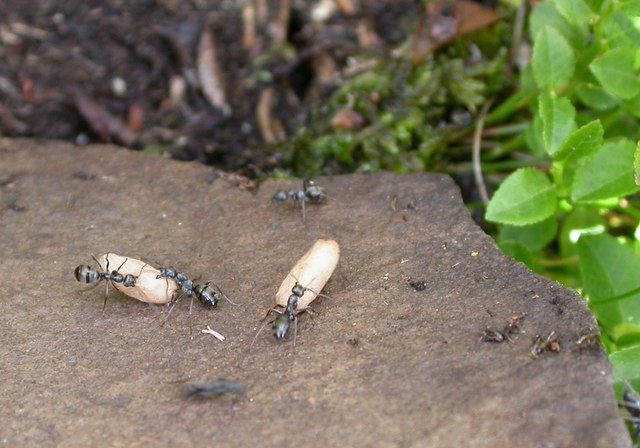

Scientific classification
- Kingdom: Animalia
- Phylum: Arthropoda
- Clade: Pancrustacea
- Class: Insecta
- Order: Hymenoptera
- Family: Formicidae
- Subfamily: Formicinae
- Genus: Formica
- Species: F. lemani

Binomial name
- Formica lemani Bondroit, 1917

= Formica lemani =

Species of ant

Formica lemani is an ant species that is similar to Formica fusca. The species was not formally distinguished as being different from Formica fusca until 1917, and was not clearly described until 1954.

This species of ant is found throughout most of Europe, and parts of Asia. They are most fond of the northern mountainous forests, as they are adapted to cooler temperatures. They inhabit the coniferous forests in those regions.
