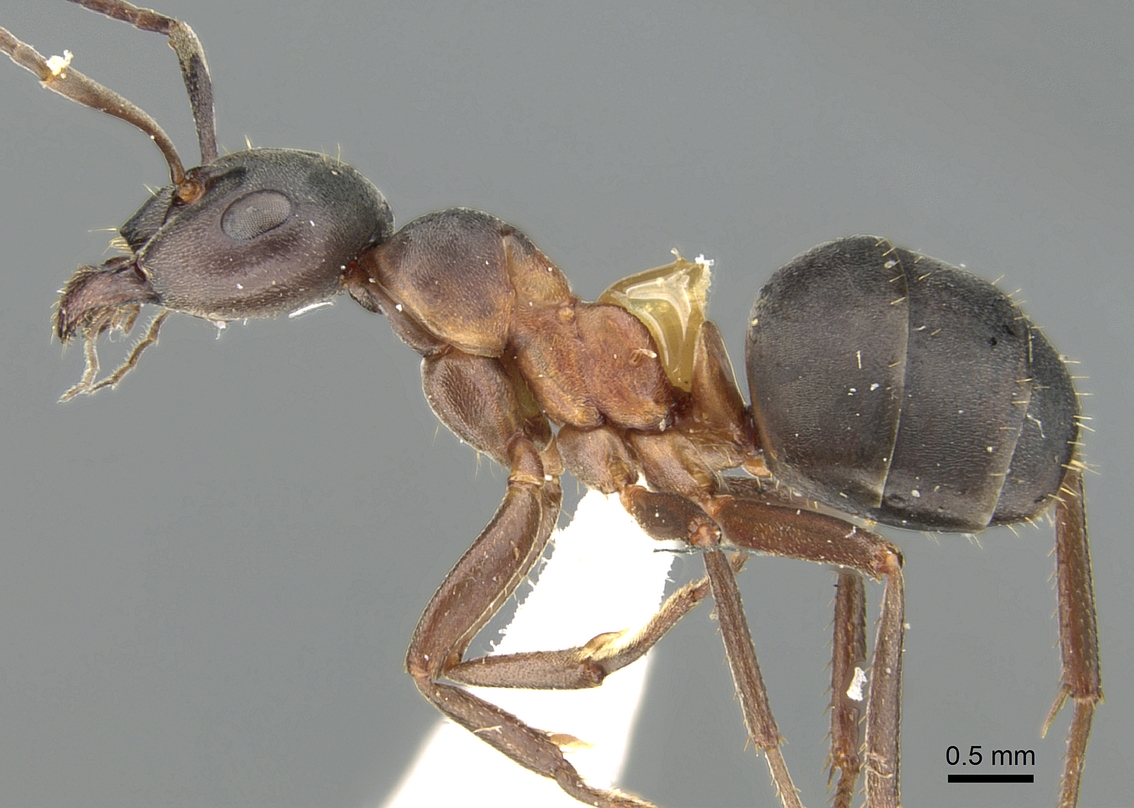

Conservation status
- Near Threatened (IUCN 2.3)

Scientific classification
- Kingdom: Animalia
- Phylum: Arthropoda
- Class: Insecta
- Order: Hymenoptera
- Family: Formicidae
- Subfamily: Formicinae
- Genus: Formica
- Species: F. uralensis

Binomial name
- Formica uralensis Ruzsky, 1895

= Formica uralensis =

Species of ant

Formica uralensis is a species of ant found in Europe. It has been found from France to Scandinavia and Kazakhstan.
