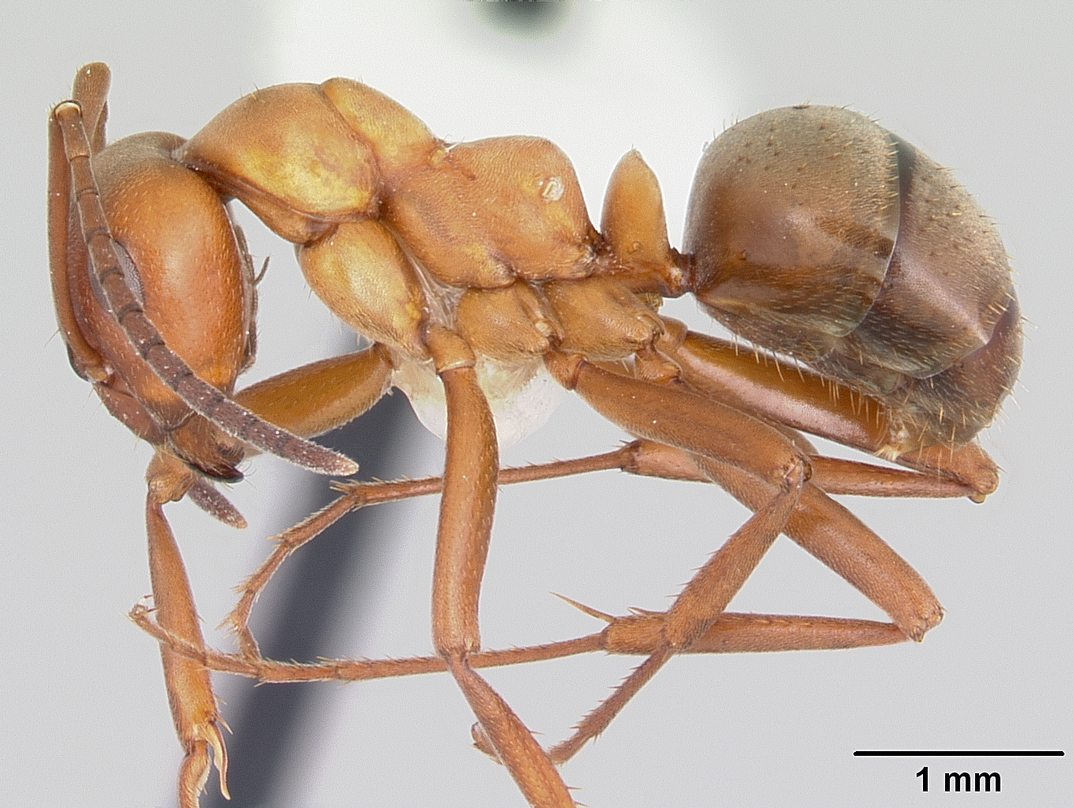
- Formica subintegra worker

Scientific classification
- Domain: Eukaryota
- Kingdom: Animalia
- Phylum: Arthropoda
- Class: Insecta
- Order: Hymenoptera
- Family: Formicidae
- Subfamily: Formicinae
- Genus: Formica
- Species: F. subintegra

Binomial name
- Formica subintegra Wheeler, 1908

= Formica subintegra =

Species of ant

Formica subintegra is a species of slave-making ant in the genus Formica. Formica subintegra seems to be obligate parasites, enslaving ants of the fusca group of Formica. The ants are not active outside the nest except during slave-raids; foraging is conducted entirely by their slaves, which make up 70-90% of the colony.
