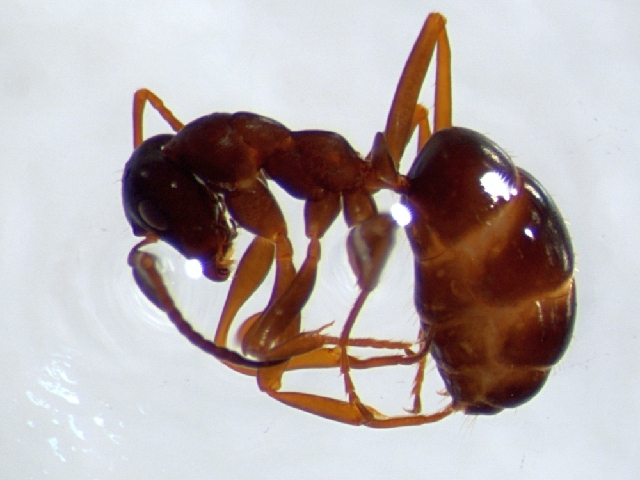

Scientific classification
- Domain: Eukaryota
- Kingdom: Animalia
- Phylum: Arthropoda
- Class: Insecta
- Order: Hymenoptera
- Family: Formicidae
- Subfamily: Formicinae
- Tribe: Formicini
- Genus: Formica
- Species: F. gagatoides

Binomial name
- Formica gagatoides Ruzsky, 1904

= Formica gagatoides =

Species of ant

Formica gagatoides is a species of ant in the family Formicidae. It is found in Europe.
