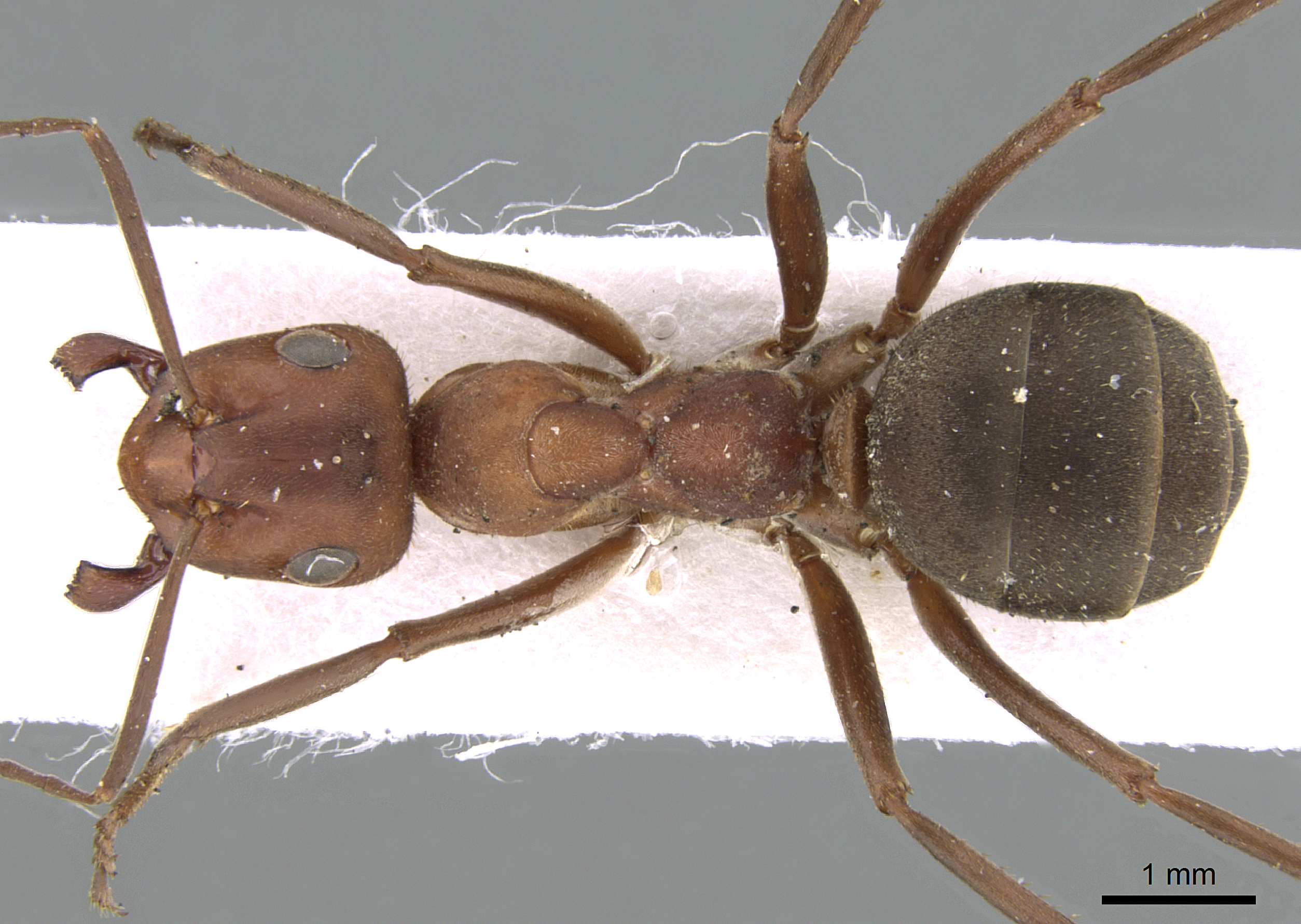
- Formica yessensis worker

Scientific classification
- Domain: Eukaryota
- Kingdom: Animalia
- Phylum: Arthropoda
- Class: Insecta
- Order: Hymenoptera
- Family: Formicidae
- Subfamily: Formicinae
- Genus: Formica
- Species: F. yessensis

Binomial name
- Formica yessensis Wheeler, 1913

= Formica yessensis =

Species of ant

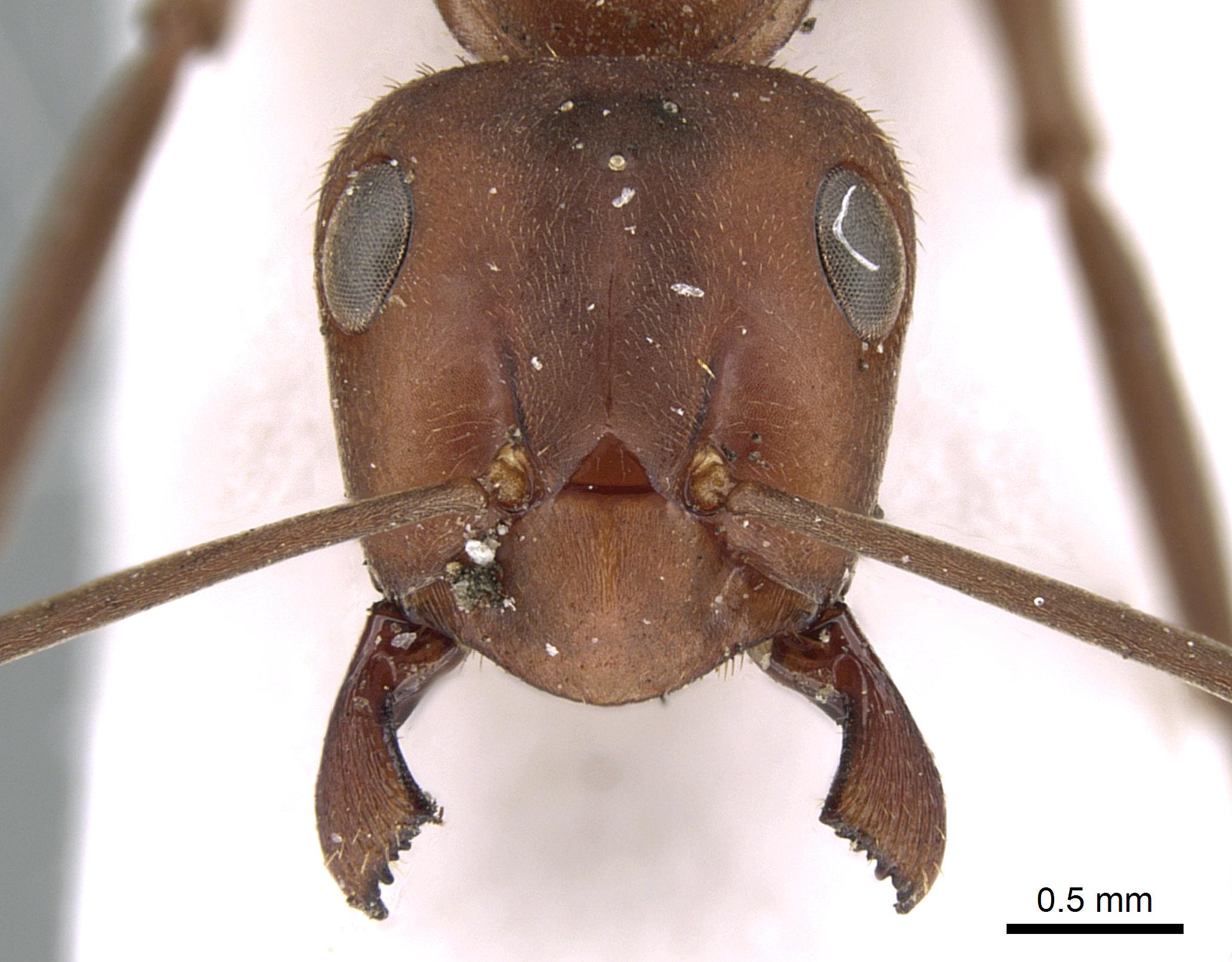
Formica yessensis' head.

Formica yessensis is a species of ant in the genus Formica, being known from eastern Asia and Japan. This species is especially known for its large colonies, sometimes exceeding 300 million individuals. The workers are typically 8-10 mm in length.
