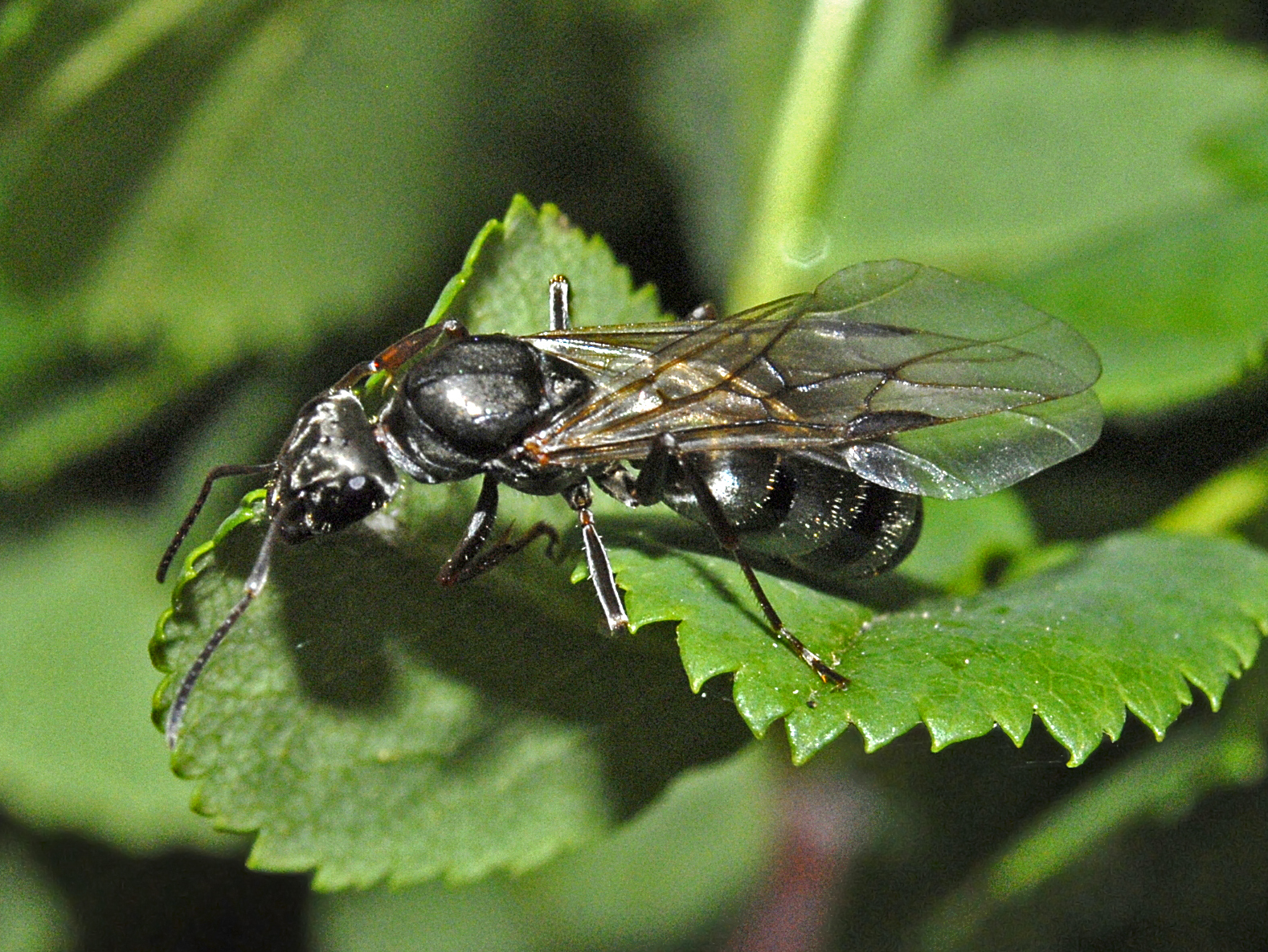
- Formica cinerea alate queen

Scientific classification
- Kingdom: Animalia
- Phylum: Arthropoda
- Class: Insecta
- Order: Hymenoptera
- Family: Formicidae
- Subfamily: Formicinae
- Genus: Formica
- Species: F. cinerea

Binomial name
- Formica cinerea Mayr, 1853

Synonyms
- Formica balcanina Petrov & Collingwood, 1993; F. cinerea var. imitans Ruzky, 1902; F. cinerea var. armenica Ruzky, 1905; F. cinerea var. subrufoides Forel, 1913; F. cinerea var. cinereoglebaria Kulmaticky, 1922; F. cinerea var. iberica Finzi, 1928; F. cinerea var. italica Finzi, 1928; F. cinerea var. novaki Kratochvil, 1941

= Formica cinerea =

Species of ant

Formica cinerea is a species of ant in the family Formicidae.

== Distribution ==
This species is distributed through the majority of Europe, from Spain to western Siberia and from Scandinavia to the Balkans. Its also present in the Near East and in the eastern Palearctic realm. It is lacking in the UK.

== Description ==
Formica cinerea can reach a length of 4–7 millimetres (0.16–0.28 in) in workers, or 8–11 millimetres (0.31–0.43 in) in queens. Body is dark gray or silvery, large and agile, with extra large eyes and dark reddish legs.

This species can be easily confused with Formica fusca, Formica fuscocinerea and Formica selysi. The distinction of these species is very difficult and it is only possible under the microscope.

== Habitat ==
Underground nest are usually built in dry and sunny sand habitats with scarce vegetation. It is often found together with the ant Lasius psammophilus on sand-dunes. Also occurs in human-constructed open habitats such as river dams, on seaside beaches and occurs up to 1800–2500 m in the mountains.

== Biology ==
This species predates mostly insects, arachnids and other invertebrates, and also feeds on honeydew. It is very aggressive and therefore it is hardly used by other ant species as the host species. As an adaptation to open habitats these ants have good vision and can run very fast. Colonies may either be monogyne or polygyne, the latter frequently develop into vast and very populous polydomous systems. The swarming takes place from June to August, with a winter rest from October to March.

== Gallery ==
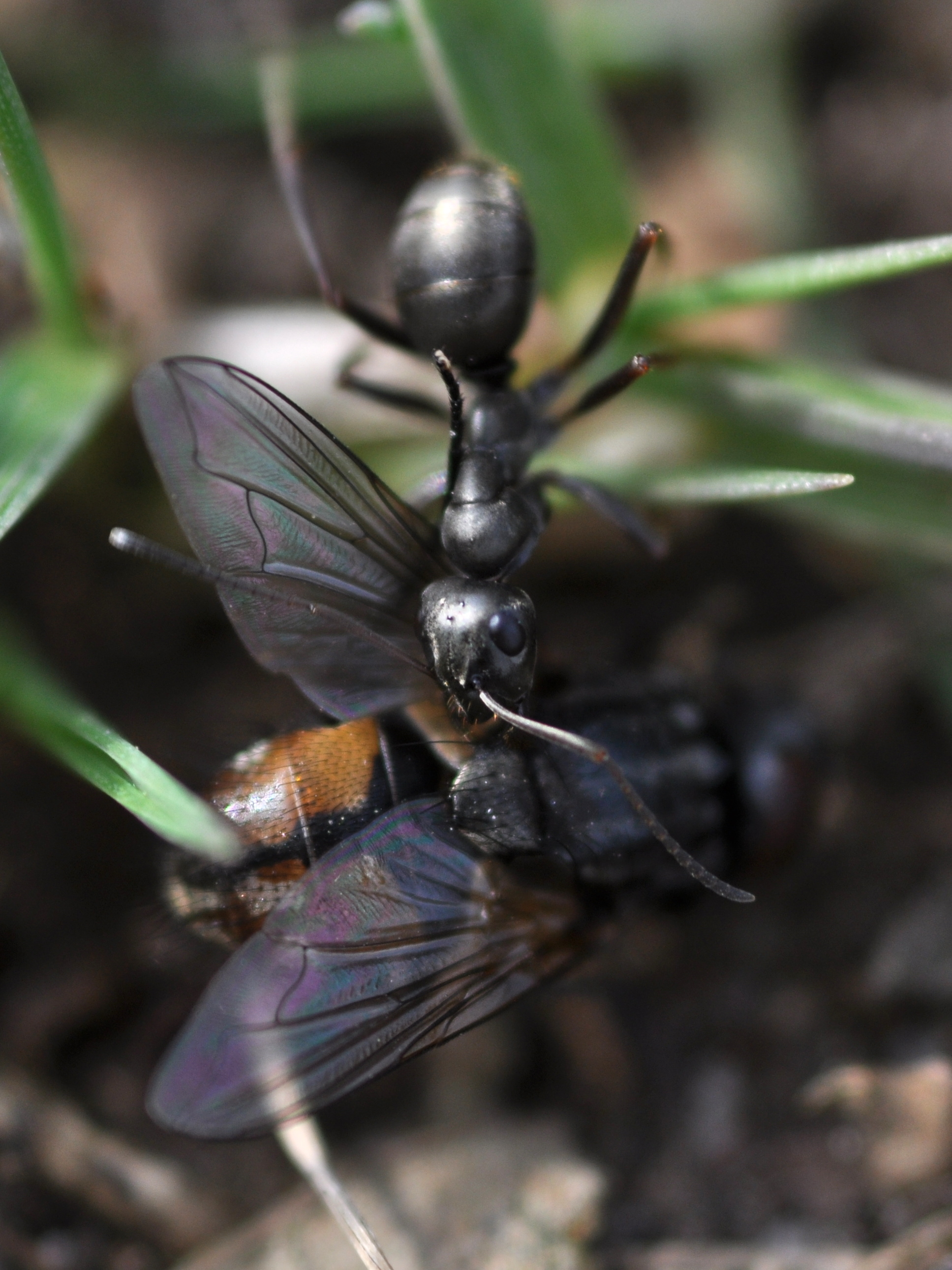
Formica cinerea carrying a fly

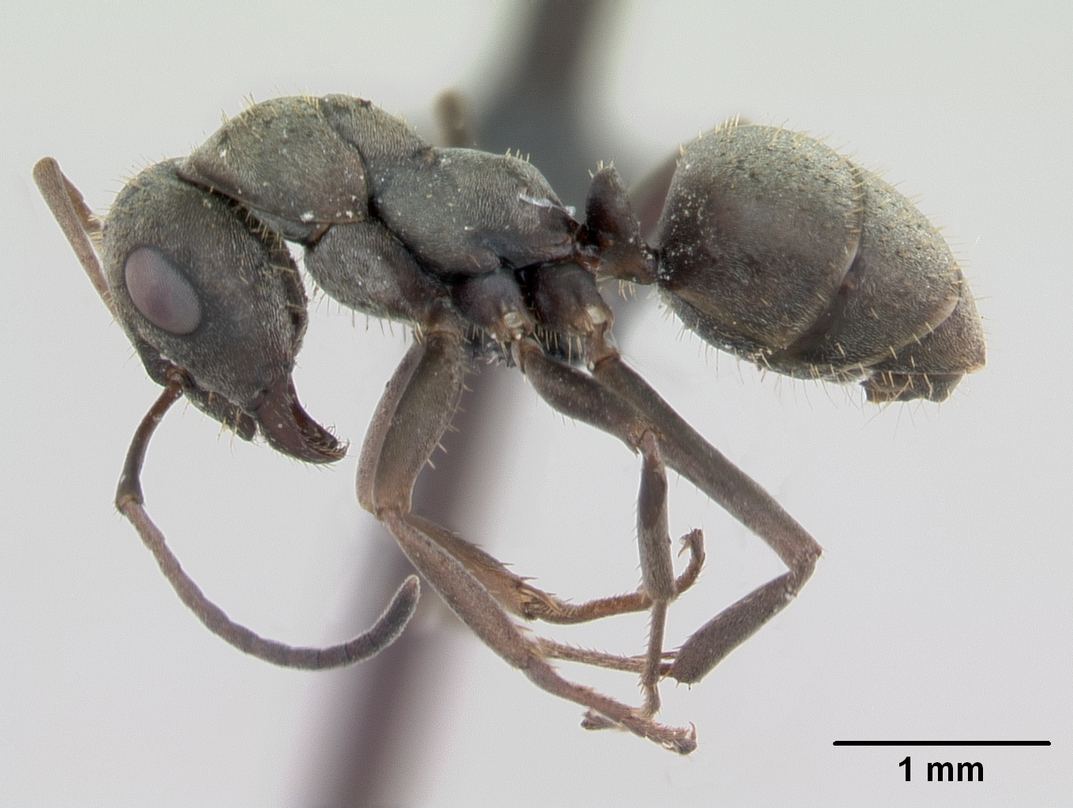
Worker. Museum specimen

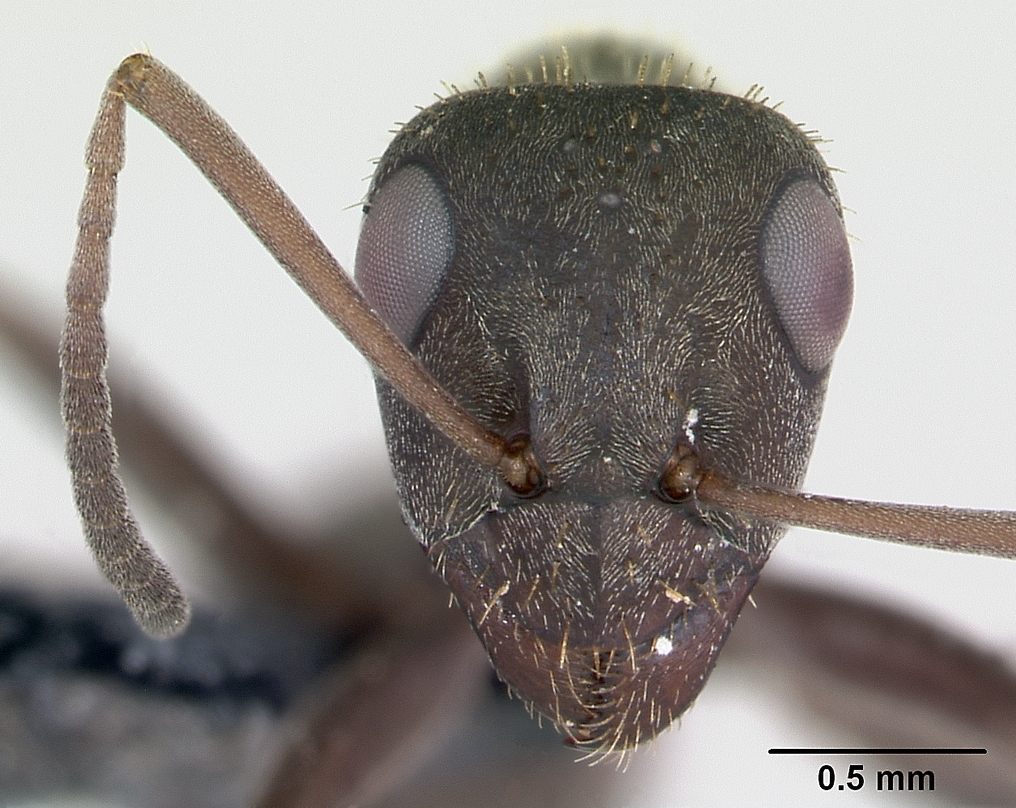
Detail of head

== Bibliography ==
- Csősz S, Markó B, Gallé L 2011. The myrmecofauna (Hymenoptera: Formicidae) of Hungary: an updated checklist North-Western Journal of Zoology 7: 55—62.
- Czechowski W, Markó B 2005. Competition between Formica cinerea Mayr (Hymenoptera: Formicidae) and co-occurring ant species, with special reference to Formica rufa L.: direct and indirect interferences Polish Journal of Ecology 53: 467—487.
- Markó B, Czechowski W 2004. Lasius psammophilus Seifert and Formica cinerea Mayr (Hymenoptera: Formicidae) on sand dunes: conflicts and coexistence Annales Zoologici 54: 365—378.
