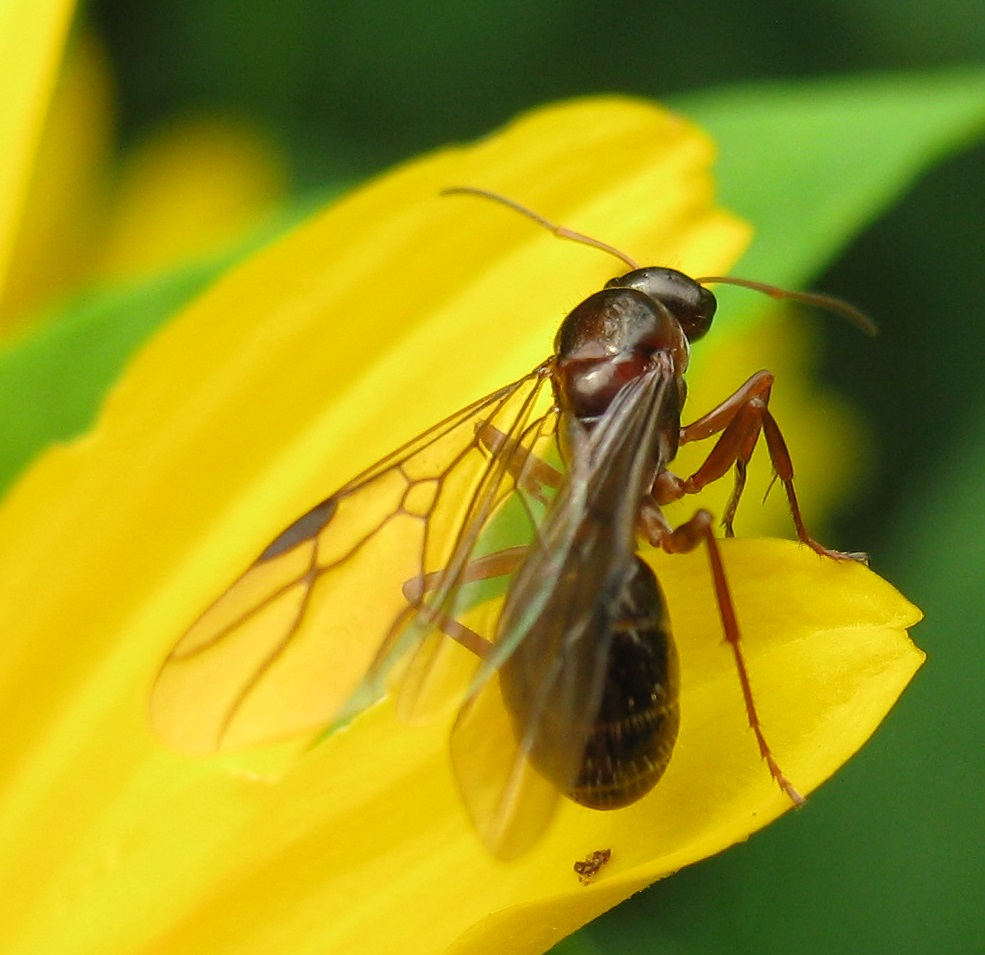
- Alate

Scientific classification
- Kingdom: Animalia
- Phylum: Arthropoda
- Clade: Pancrustacea
- Class: Insecta
- Order: Hymenoptera
- Family: Formicidae
- Subfamily: Formicinae
- Genus: Formica
- Species: F. neogagates

Binomial name
- Formica neogagates Viereck, 1903

= Formica neogagates =

Species of ant

F. neogagates queen under a microscope. Notice the ant larvae and the wing stubs on the thorax left over from the nuptial flight

Formica neogagates is a species of ant in the family Formicidae. It is found throughout North America, and has been introduced to France.
