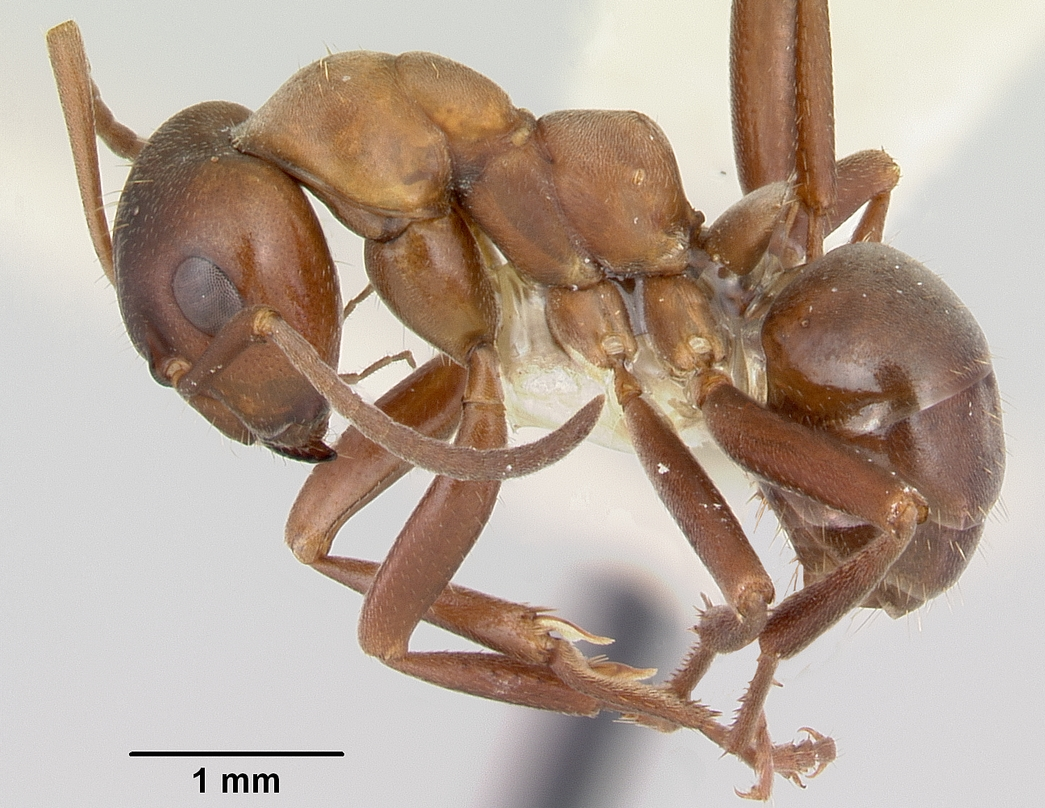
- Worker

Scientific classification
- Domain: Eukaryota
- Kingdom: Animalia
- Phylum: Arthropoda
- Class: Insecta
- Order: Hymenoptera
- Family: Formicidae
- Subfamily: Formicinae
- Genus: Formica
- Species: F. creightoni

Binomial name
- Formica creightoni Buren, 1968

= Formica creightoni =

Species of ant

Formica creightoni is a species of ant in the genus Formica ("wood ants, mound ants, & field ants"), in the family Formicidae ("ants").
