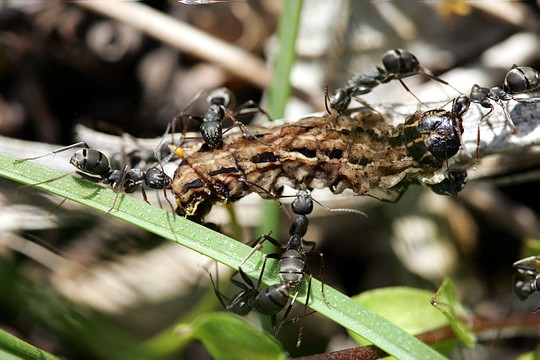
- Formica japonica carrying a dead bug

Scientific classification
- Kingdom: Animalia
- Phylum: Arthropoda
- Clade: Pancrustacea
- Class: Insecta
- Order: Hymenoptera
- Family: Formicidae
- Subfamily: Formicinae
- Genus: Formica
- Species: F. japonica

Binomial name
- Formica japonica Motschoulsky, 1866

Synonyms
- Formica fusca nipponensis Forel, 1900

= Formica japonica =

Species of ant

Formica japonica is a species of ant in the genus Formica. It is one of the most common ants in Japan, being found as well in Russia, Mongolia, China, Taiwan, and Korea.

== Diversity ==
There is a suggestion that Formica japonica may be four separate "sibling species" as a study found four different hydrocarbon compositions throughout Japan that appeared to correspond to geographical populations, that is, the geographical populations smell different from one another. The comparisons of circular hydrocarbons revealed nestmate workers shared nearly identical blends of smells that contained all the common components of hydrocarbons but the hydrocarbon blends smelled differed among colonies. However, further research is needed to determine if the differences in hydrocarbon components are due to intraspecific variation or are due to interspecific variation and if hybridization occurs between different hydrocarbon compositions. It is not uncommon within insect taxonomy that reclassification such as this occurs, often with the continuation of time and advancement of technology, researchers are able to learn more about species. Furthermore, this delineation of species has occurred within Formica japonica taxon before with Formica hayashi that was found to have slightly different habitats.

== Colony Structure ==
F. japonica has been observed to form both monogynous and polygynous colonies, however polygynous is more common and DNA analysis conducted revealed that queens likely mate with only one male. These colonies nest in soil as described by AntWiki and can contain hundreds or thousands of worker ants. Colonies can vary from 1-22 queens per nest but on average have 2-9. In polygynous colonies queens have been found to not always equally contribute to the production of new queens (gynes) within one colony.

In the early summer months, new queens and males are produced and remain in the colony until sexual maturity, during this time they are socially supported by workers of that colony who feed them through trophallaxis and groom them. During the summer when new queens are cared for their brain biogenic amines, which act as neurotransmitters, naturally increase with age.

Mating is an important event in many species life cycles and with it can come major physiological and behavioral changes. New queens and male drones go through nuptial flights where they leave their colonies and disperse looking for mates. Following copulation, queens must establish a colony, which is very energetically costly because she must raise her first brood on her own, leading her to experience starvation and social isolation. During the search for a place to nest, some queens may join an existing colony, which is why there is an observed increase in the number of queens in July-August from May-June. But for other queens who establish their own colony, researchers found there were changes in their neurotransmitter levels after mating, displaying a decrease in dopamine, octopamine, and serotonin with an increase in tyramine. The differences in brain chemistry after copulation is understood to show a role change from mating to colony formation as the neurotransmitter systems regulate social behaviour and nestmate recognition, likely helping to suppress unnecessary aggression, adjust sensory systems, and shift focus to egg laying, brood care and solitary survival.

Within a colony, workers perform different tasks such as nursing, foraging, and guarding.Workers that are tasked with foraging and guarding display more aggression than a worker who's responsible for nursing larva and pupae. Additionally, if required, F. japonica ants can switch tasks depending on the needs of the colony.

Foraging is a critical aspect to ants and they can transport large food items in a few ways; individually breaking food up into pieces and transporting those pieces or cooperatively with other nest mates. There are two types of cooperative transport, coordinated transport is where ants surround the food and move quickly in the same direction, reducing chances of getting stuck and uncoordinated transport where ants often get stuck and move more slowly. However, an interesting aspect of uncoordinated transport is a term called route reassessment whereby some ants dragging the food item will stop and leave only to return shortly after, becoming more efficient and accurate in the transportation suggesting the ants figured out the best route to take when they were gone.

Another way ants can transport food is with tool-like behavior. Small food items can be transported individually, or more interestingly they can place small food items on top of a larger food item and use the large food item as if it were a 'cart'. However, this is a weakly termed form of tool use and it is important to recognize aspects of anthropomorphizing within tool use definitions.

== Communication ==
F. japonica is a eusocial species of insect. Often insects use chemical communication with the use of circular hydrocarbons (CHC), which are waxy lipids on the cuticle of their body that smell and additionally help prevent desiccation.

These hydrocarbons are heritable and has led researchers to use them as taxonomic criteria, due to the findings that these hydrocarbon compositions are species specific and the compositions of them can be colony specific as well. This chemotaxonomical approach isn't just used in ants but beetles, moths, termites and parasitic wasps, as these hydrocarbon compositions provide a new dimension for species discrimination.

Additionally, there is evidence that F. japonica ants use these hydrocarbons to recognize nestmates and these hydrocarbon compositions change at three levels: within the same colony, between different colonies, and across seasons. The hydrocarbons are produced by the post-pharyngeal gland and the smell is distributed on the ants surface; the cuticle, by acts of self grooming, trophallaxis, and allogrooming, providing the colony's unique smell.

Each colony has a unique profile of hydrocarbons and these profiles differ between colonies allowing F. japonica use the hydrocarbons to recognize their nest mates. This explains how worker ants show aggression to non nest mates.

Stress can also impact their brain chemicals and social behavior. Dopamine is linked to motivation and social behavior. Starvation stress in F. japonica ants is associated with a decrease in dopamine, causing social behaviors to change, such as stopping trophallaxis, to which their social behavior can only be recovered with the combination of restoring sugar levels and being fed by nestmates. Isolation stress also causes a decrease in trophallaxis but an increase in self grooming and allogrooming to which recovery involves increasing their interaction with nestmates.

However the function of hydrocarbons being used to recognize nestmates and for communication is still considered controversial for ants. While some say they are effective for species discrimination; suggesting compositions are constant. Others say these compositions or 'profiles' are not constant and change over time, suggesting ants don't recognize a fixed smell for their colony but often update their recognition of their colony's smell. One explanation for the changing of colony smell, is that it may be a result of defense against social parasites that mimic their smell to sneak in and be cared for by the ants or due to changing environmental factors.

== Navigation ==
There are two types of navigation strategies ants can use: path integration, where there is an internal system tracking their direction and distance and landmark navigation, where visual stimuli of the environment is remembered. F. japonica can use both at the same time but can also navigate using only landmarks on the ground like rocks, plants, or the shape of scenery.

Researchers determined this by testing two types of ants, ants who had just begun a trip and still had an internal compass towards where they were going and ants who had not completed a trip and had no internal path integration stored in memory. Researchers removed these ants from their path and found the ants who were still using an internal compass were able to find their desired destination more efficiently and directly whereas, the ants without that internal compass used landmarks alone to find their desired destination, performing less efficiently and wandered around far more.

== Predation ==
Ants, like many animals, often fight with their own and other species. Showing leveling degrees of aggression, queens often only show defensive threat behavior whereas her workers show higher levels of offensive aggression. Worker ants of F. japonica were observed to hunt and attack crickets. Researchers examined their brains and found these workers had higher levels of octopamine, a neurohormone/neurotransmitter, which is related to aggression and looked at queen brains that showed they had less octopamine which may explain their lower levels of aggression.

== Parasites ==
There is a butterfly species (Lycaeides argyrognomon) whose larvae sometimes live with F. japonica ants, a term called myrmecophily with the help of specialized organs that are often lost after pupation. These butterflies' specialized organ mimics the smell of the ants reducing attacks on them, however this chemical camouflage isn't perfect because ants use other senses meaning there is still a risk of being bitten and/or injured by F. japonica ants.
