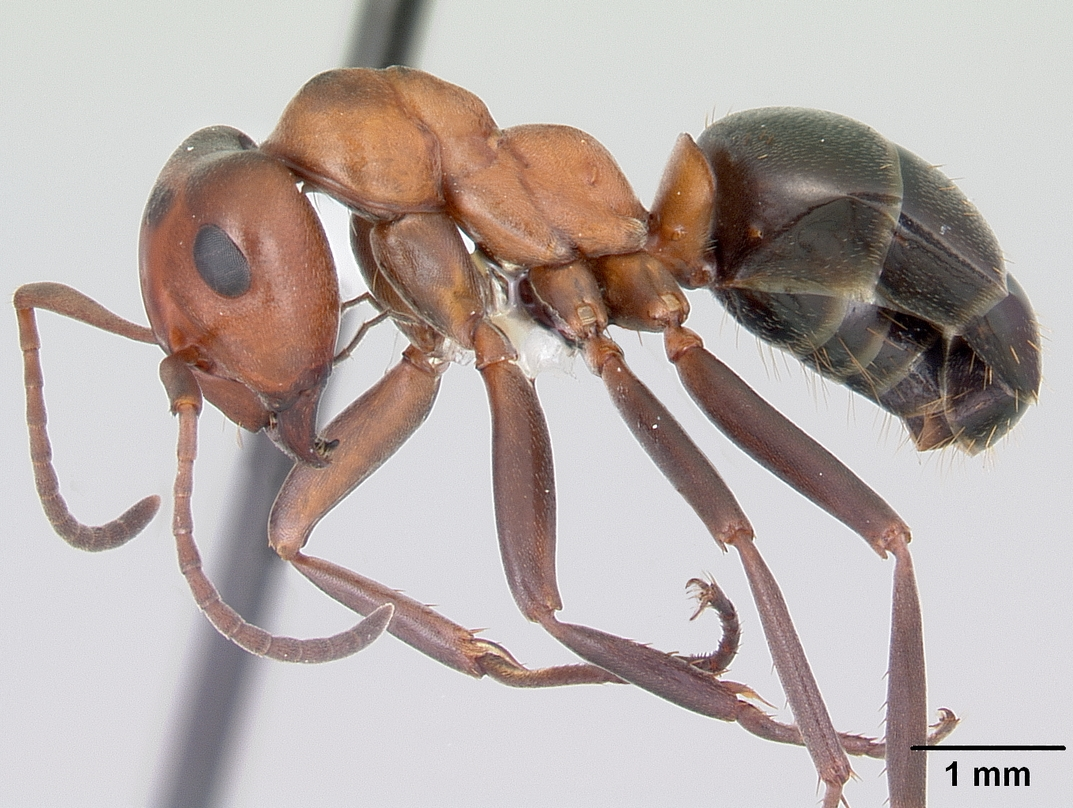

Scientific classification
- Domain: Eukaryota
- Kingdom: Animalia
- Phylum: Arthropoda
- Class: Insecta
- Order: Hymenoptera
- Family: Formicidae
- Subfamily: Formicinae
- Genus: Formica
- Species: F. exsectoides

Binomial name
- Formica exsectoides Forel, 1886

= Allegheny mound ant =

Species of ant

The Allegheny mound ant (Formica exsectoides) is a species of ant native to the Atlantic area of North America. Its range extends from Nova Scotia to parts of Georgia. Like other field ants, the Allegheny mound ant builds large mounds, however this species tends to build some of the largest. To keep their mounds exposed to the sun, the ants kill vegetation within 40 to 50 feet (12 to 15 m). They do this by injecting formic acid into plant stems, killing small trees and shrubs. Members of the formic acid producing genus Formica are known for their citrus taste. The Allegheny mound ant's appearance is very striking: both its head and thorax are red-orange; its gaster is black-brown. The ant's colonies are complex. Several different mounds may be interconnected. The tunnels may extend 3 feet (0.91 m) into the ground and 4 feet (1.2 m) upwards in the mound. The mound serves as a solar incubator for the eggs and larvae. Unlike most other ants, Allegheny mound ants have multiple queens. Maturation from egg to adult takes 2.5–3 months. They hunt a wide assortment of arthropods as a protein source and collect aphid honeydew as a source of sugars.

The ants are very aggressive and will bite if a mound is disturbed.

In the Northeastern United States, Allegheny mound ants (Formica exsectoides) are credited with causing lesions typically in the form of a deep constriction about 10 cm long on the main stem of small individuals of a variety of species, both hardwoods and conifers, including white pine and Scots pine. Spruces were not mentioned, but Peirson did not state whether spruces had been examined. The mounds vary in size with age, many reaching 1 m in height and 2 m in diameter. No live trees or shrubs of any height occur in close proximity to the mounds.

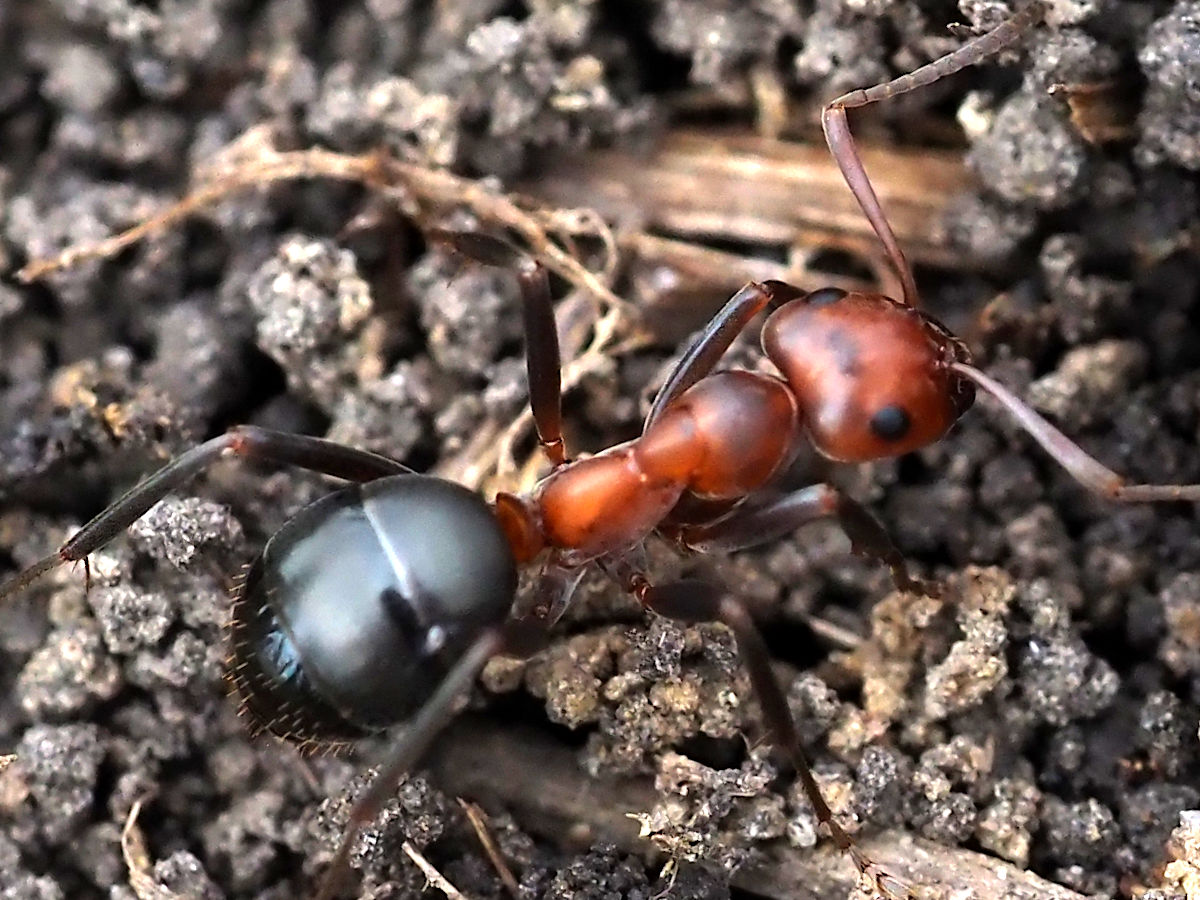
dorsal view

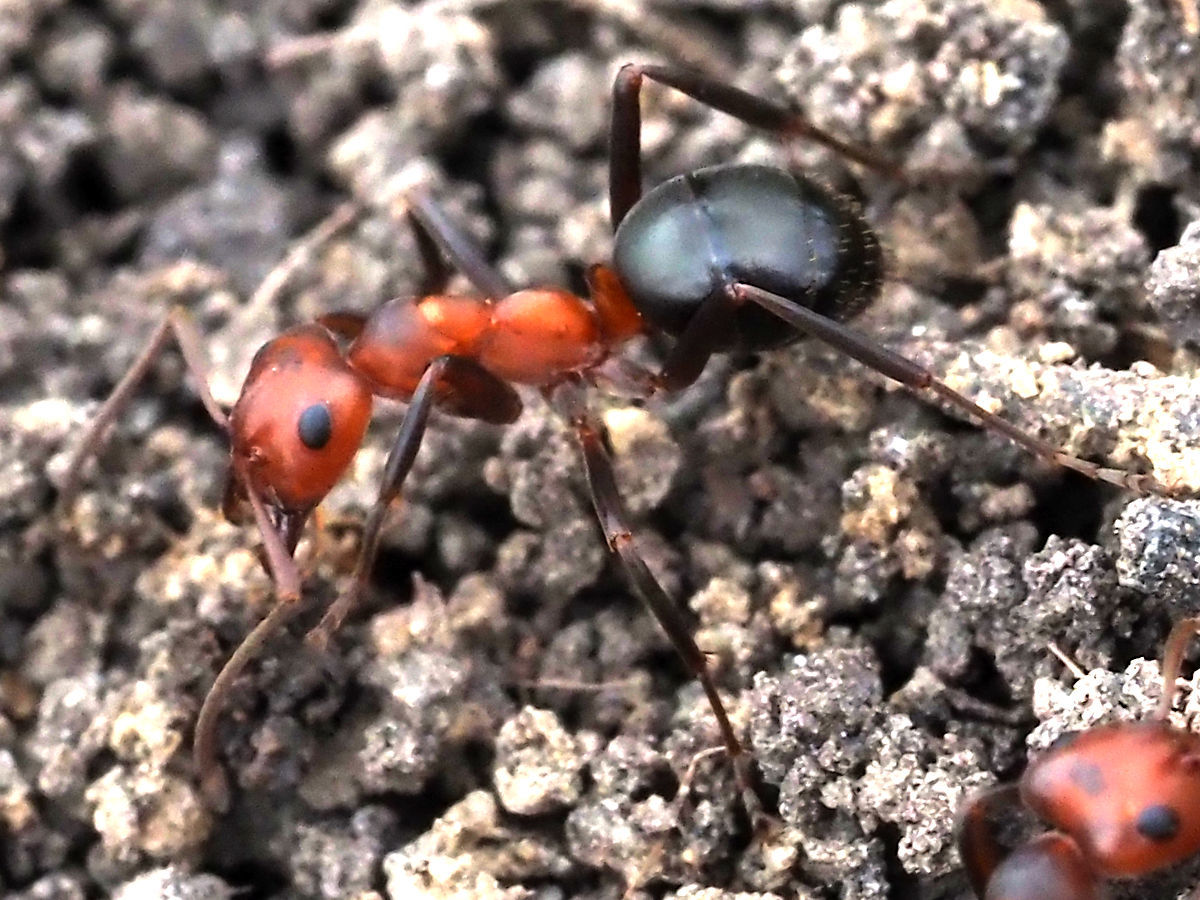
lateral view
