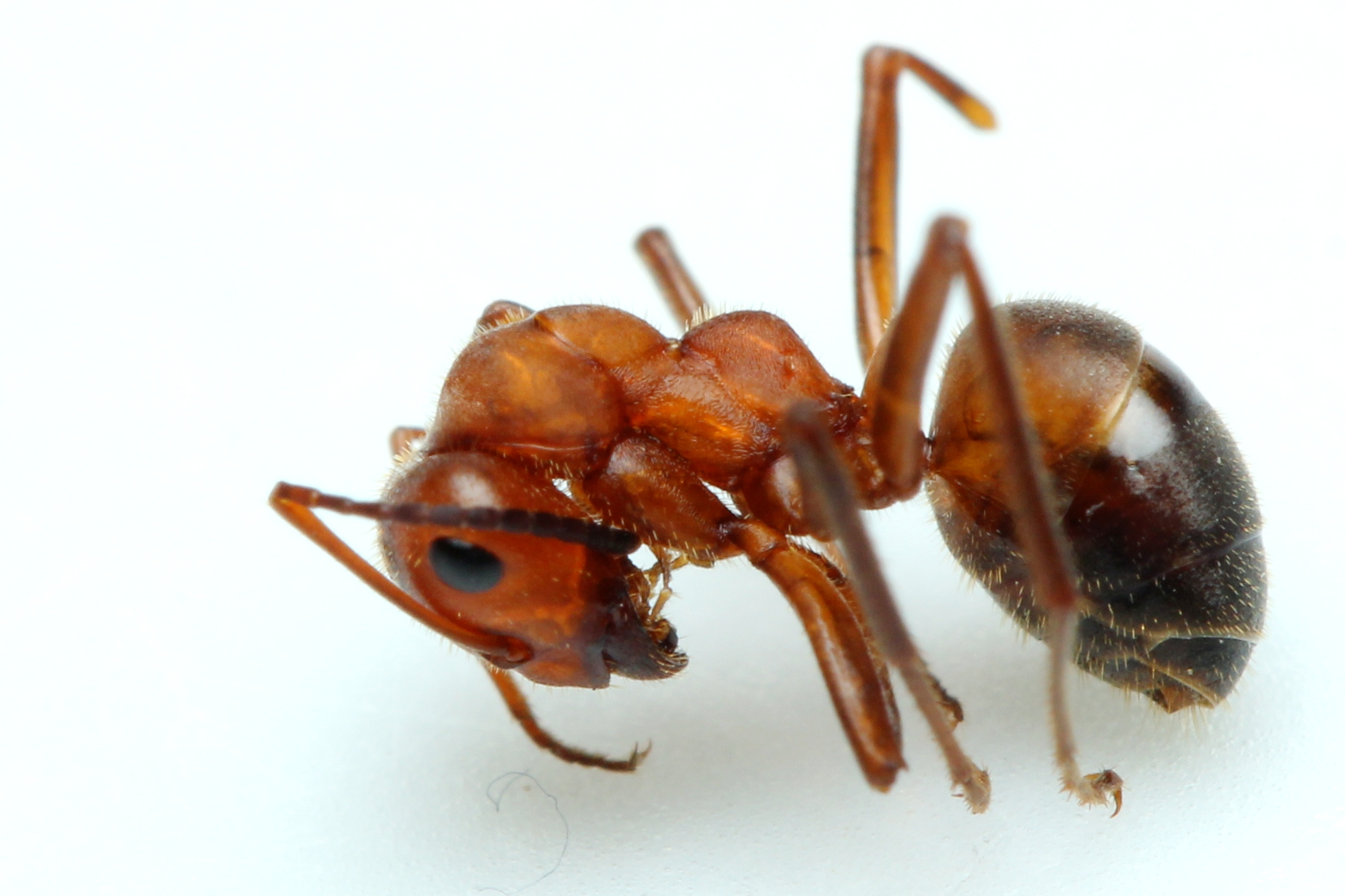
- Formica truncorum worker

Scientific classification
- Kingdom: Animalia
- Phylum: Arthropoda
- Clade: Pancrustacea
- Class: Insecta
- Order: Hymenoptera
- Family: Formicidae
- Subfamily: Formicinae
- Genus: Formica
- Species: F. truncorum

Binomial name
- Formica truncorum Fabricius, 1804

= Formica truncorum =

Species of ant

Formica truncorum is a species of wood ant from the genus Formica. It is distributed across a variety of locations worldwide, including central Europe and Japan. Workers can range from 3.5 to 9.0mm and are uniquely characterized by small hairs covering their entire bodies. Like all other ants, F. truncorum is eusocial and demonstrates many cooperative behaviors that are unique to its order. Colonies are either monogynous, with one queen, or polygynous, with many queens, and these two types of colonies differ in many characteristics.

== Range and habitat ==
F. truncorum is located in many places worldwide, such as northern Japan, the Jura Mountains and many regions from Italy to Norway. The colonies, which can be polygynous and often polydomous (where several nests are occupied by one colony), are spread out in regions of woodland borders, where the ants will make their nests in tree stumps.

== Morphology ==
F. truncorum ants are characterized by a grey-brown gaster and bright yellow-red head and thorax. The smaller workers are normally darker in color. They can be distinguished from other species of Formica by the small erect setae covering their entire body. Workers can range in size from 3.5 to 9.0 mm.

== Behaviour ==
=== Eusociality ===
F. truncorum is a member of the insect order Hymenoptera, which contains the majority of the eusocial insects. F. truncorum demonstrates some characteristics specific to eusociality. There is cooperative rearing of young, which is thought to provide a sort of 'life insurance' for the female's brood. If the female were to die during the rearing process, others would take her place to finish raising the brood. The value of this cooperation may justify the cost. Another defining characteristic of eusociality is the evolution of specific castes within the species, some of which are sterile. Castes in F. truncorum include the drones, the winged male ants with the sole purpose of reproducing, the queen, who sheds her wings after the nuptial flight, and the sterile workers which can vary in size depending on specialized tasks.

Eusocial behaviour is thought to have evolved as a result of kin selection within monogamous colonies. In multiply mated colonies, the relatedness between siblings is lowered, which diminishes the benefits of altruistic behaviour within the colony. Only in monogamous colonies would the relatedness between individuals in a colony remain high, which could allow the benefits of eusociality to be justified by Hamilton's rule.

==== Cuticular kin recognition ====
The kin selection that is necessary for eusociality to evolve would require a signal that allows for related members of a species to recognize each other. A study has indicated that in F. truncorum this signal may be the hydrocarbon profile located on the cuticle of each ant. Further examination of these hydrocarbon chains has shown that many contain chains longer than 34 carbons, and while there is enough similarity between cuticles to recognize members of the same colony, they are still diverse enough to be distinct between colonies. Ants which are genetically similar have similar hydrocarbon profiles, which could allow kin to recognize one another through this similarity. Studies have shown that there is a correlation between the cuticular hydrocarbon profile and the dispersal tendencies of particular colonies.

=== Foraging ===
The social divisions of the eusocial ants can allow for the creation of subsets of populations with specific duties assigned to them, which can be applied to a variety of tasks, including foraging. Foraging will usually involve the discovery of small caches of food, with some of them being persistent and reliable and others being very transient. This difference in reliability causes the foragers of F. truncorum to divide into two groups with a specific task. One group will patrol the reliable sites, and the other will scan empty food sites in search of new sources of food. Upon discovering a new source, the foragers will recruit from the nest and will not recruit any foragers already outside. Not all of the recruited foragers will carry food back to the nest, suggesting that some are recruited for defense of the site.

The foraging habits of F. truncorum were also observed by placing baits near foraging areas and then observing the ability of the ants to recruit additional worker to transport the food back to the nest. This process of recruitment is done in a simple manner, where workers that have discovered food will lay a pheromone trail that connects the food to the nest, and additional workers will detect and follow the scent of this trail. Trails that are currently leading towards additional food will have pheromone trails that are more recently placed, and will also likely have a stronger scent due to multiple ants laying down pheromones, which allows the workers to quickly react to changes in the direction of the food source by following the newest and strongest trails. F. truncorum has demonstrated an interested characteristic of its foraging ability where it can successfully follow a trail in light but not in darkness. This suggests a visual component in addition to the pheromone trail that is not fully understood.

=== Sex ratio conflict ===
Studies of F. truncorum have shown that the sex ratio varies between being female-biased or male-biased depending on how many times the queen has mated. In cases where the queen is singly-mated, the relatedness between the workers remains high and the ratio is female-biased. This is thought to occur because of haplodiploidy, which causes the females to be more related to their own sisters than to any potential offspring. This increased relatedness between siblings causes the female workers to skew the sex ratio in their favor. In cases where the queen is multiply mated, this relatedness between siblings is lost, and the queen retains control of the sex ratio, which causes it to be male-biased.

==== Effects on fitness ====
On average, multiply mated queens have a 37% higher fitness than singly mated queens It is proposed that singly-mated queens remain in the population because the benefits of multiple-mating may have been balanced by the costs of increased predation and risk to disease transmission. The benefits of multiple-mating also decline as it becomes more numerous in the population. Another suggested possibility is that some queens are unable to find a second mate and remain singly-mated.

=== Female preference ===
It was observed in F. truncorum that when two males had their ability to sire offspring compared, one of the two would consistently create more progeny. In spite of this, there was no evidence to support the idea that one male would be particularly better at creating more offspring than the other. This indicates that the female is able to store different amounts of sperm from separate males, which would then result in one male producing significantly more offspring.

== Monogynous vs. polygynous colonies ==
=== Resource allocation ===
The resource allocation of F. truncorum ants to the formation of new reproductives was compared between monogynous and polygynous colonies by measuring the colony's productivity and mating structure. Monogynous colonies with a high productivity would have excess resources, and they invested these excess resources into the formation of more reproductives. Monogynous colonies typically had a higher ratio of sexuals per adult worker. When they had excess resources, polygynous colonies did not invest in the formation of more reproductives, indicating that the allocation of resources to the formation of reproductives is controlled by the workers.

=== Dispersal polymorphism ===
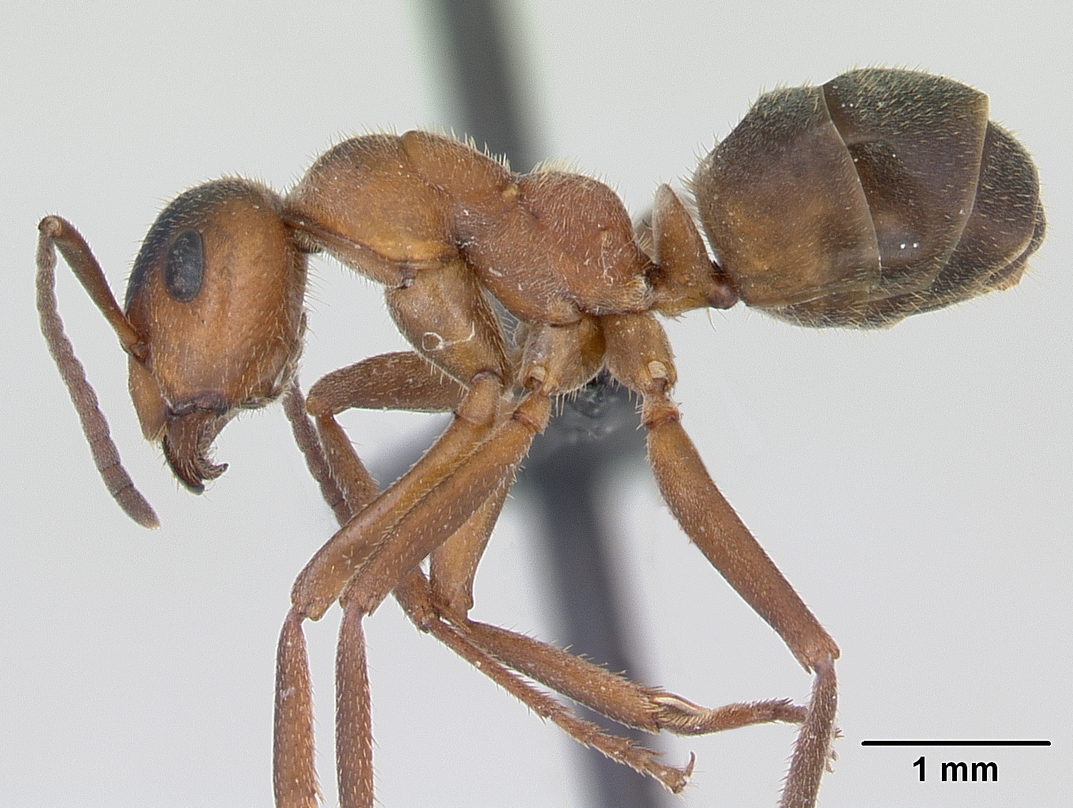
F. truncorum worker with a scale bar for reference.

The genetic population structure and sociogenetic organization of F. truncorum were compared between monogynous and polygynous colonies by using allele frequency differences between the populations and estimates of relatedness between different subsets of the colony population. The allele frequency differences between subpopulations were significant in the polygynous colonies but not detectable between the subpopulations of the monogynous colonies. This makes sense because the polygynous colonies would be expected to have multiple reproducing females from different genetic backgrounds, which would lead to differences in the allele frequencies of the workers that made up the population. Also, the polygynous colonies usually had queens that were related to their male mates, which was not the case in the monogynous colonies, suggesting a difference in dispersal between the two types. Based on this data, polygynous colonies have limited dispersal and will usually mate within the colony, while the monogynous colonies rely on outbreeding and a higher degree of dispersal.

The propensity to disperse also varies between males and females, with the main effect of this being that females that are less prone to dispersal will be more likely to stay in the colony and switch it from monogynous to polygynous. The ability of the female to leave the colony is affected by its physiological condition, where larger females with greater fat stores will preferentially disperse but smaller females are more likely to remain. Male dispersal is also determined by size, and in the case of both sexes, larger males and females are produced in monogynous colonies in accordance with their greater dispersal.

If there is a wide variation in the size of the queens produced, it is likely that monogynous colonies would not remain monogynous for any long period of time, because smaller daughters would remain and form polygynous colonies. To counteract this, queens produced in monogynous colonies must frequently be large. A study of the heritability of queen size shows that there is a significant degree of heritability in size that a daughter can receive from her mother, allowing for monogynous colonies to predictably produce larger queens that will disperse to form independent colonies.

==== Unicoloniality ====
As seen by comparing the relatedness between the queens and their male mates, polygynous colonies will typically mate within the nest. This results in reproduction that is driven by a very limited dispersal where queens will bud off of the main nest to create a large, polydomous colony. While this normally leads to high relatedness between nestmates, and a high degree of genetic structuring within the colony, nests of F. truncorum in Finland were observed to behave differently from this. These nests will shift sites, depending on the time of year, between a nest for the hibernating season and one for the reproductive season. By marking the nests and using microsatellites, researchers found that the relatedness between nestmates in these colonies was almost zero. This indicates the F. truncorum can form unicolonial populations were the workers migrate between genetically different nests.

=== Nestmate and kin recognition ===
Monogynous colonies and polygynous colonies have shown differences in how they react to nestmate recognition and queen adoption. Monogynous colonies discriminate against, and will not adopt, any non-nestmate female, while polygynous colonies are much more accepting. Monogynous colonies are not totally enclosed, however, and maintain their single-queen status through high female dispersal and low intranidal breeding. While polygynous colonies are more likely to adopt a non-nestmate female, most of the queens still come from adopted daughters within the colony.
