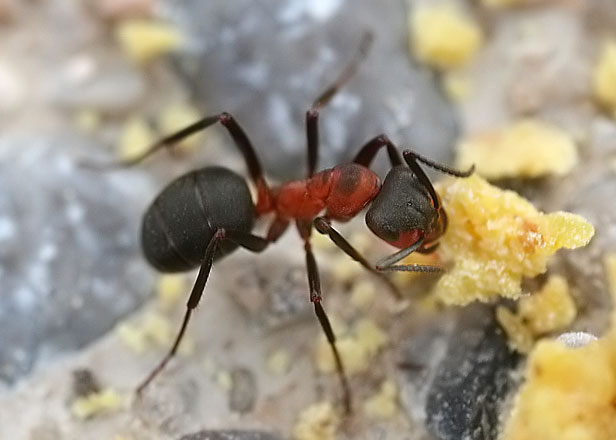
- Formica rufa

Scientific classification
- Kingdom: Animalia
- Phylum: Arthropoda
- Clade: Pancrustacea
- Class: Insecta
- Order: Hymenoptera
- Family: Formicidae
- Subfamily: Formicinae
- Tribe: Formicini
- Genus: Formica; Linnaeus, 1758

Type species
- Formica rufa

Diversity
- 221 species

Synonyms
- Adformica Lomnicki, 1925; Coptoformica Müller, 1923; Formicina Shuckard, 1840; Neoformica Wheeler, 1913; Raptiformica Forel, 1913; Serviformica Forel, 1913

= Formica =

Formica Temporal range: Eocene-present, 46–0 Ma

Genus of ants

Formica is a genus of ants of the subfamily Formicinae, including species commonly known as wood ants, mound ants, thatching ants, and field ants. Formica is the type genus of the Formicidae, and of the subfamily Formicinae. The type species of genus Formica is the European red wood ant Formica rufa. Ants of this genus tend to be between 4 and 8 mm long.

== Etymology ==
The genus name Formica comes directly from the Latin formīca, meaning "ant". Formic acid, which is produced by these ants and others, takes its name from ants.

== Habitat ==
As the name wood ant implies, many Formica species live in wooded areas where no shortage of material exists with which they can thatch their mounds (often called anthills). One shade-tolerant species is F. lugubris. However, sunlight is important to most Formica species, and colonies rarely survive for any considerable period in deeply shaded, dense woodland. The majority of species, especially outside the F. rufa species group, are inhabitants of more open woodlands or treeless grassland or shrubland. In North America, at least, these habitats had a long history of frequent landscape-scale fires that kept them open before European settlement. Conversion to agriculture and fire suppression have reduced the abundance of most American Formica species, while the cessation of traditional haycutting seems to have had the same effect in Europe. However, at least a few Formica species may be found in a wide range of habitats from cities to seasides to grasslands to swamps to forests of the temperate Northern Hemisphere.

In more suburban landscapes, they tend to nest near structures such as sidewalks, fences, or building foundations.

== Nests ==
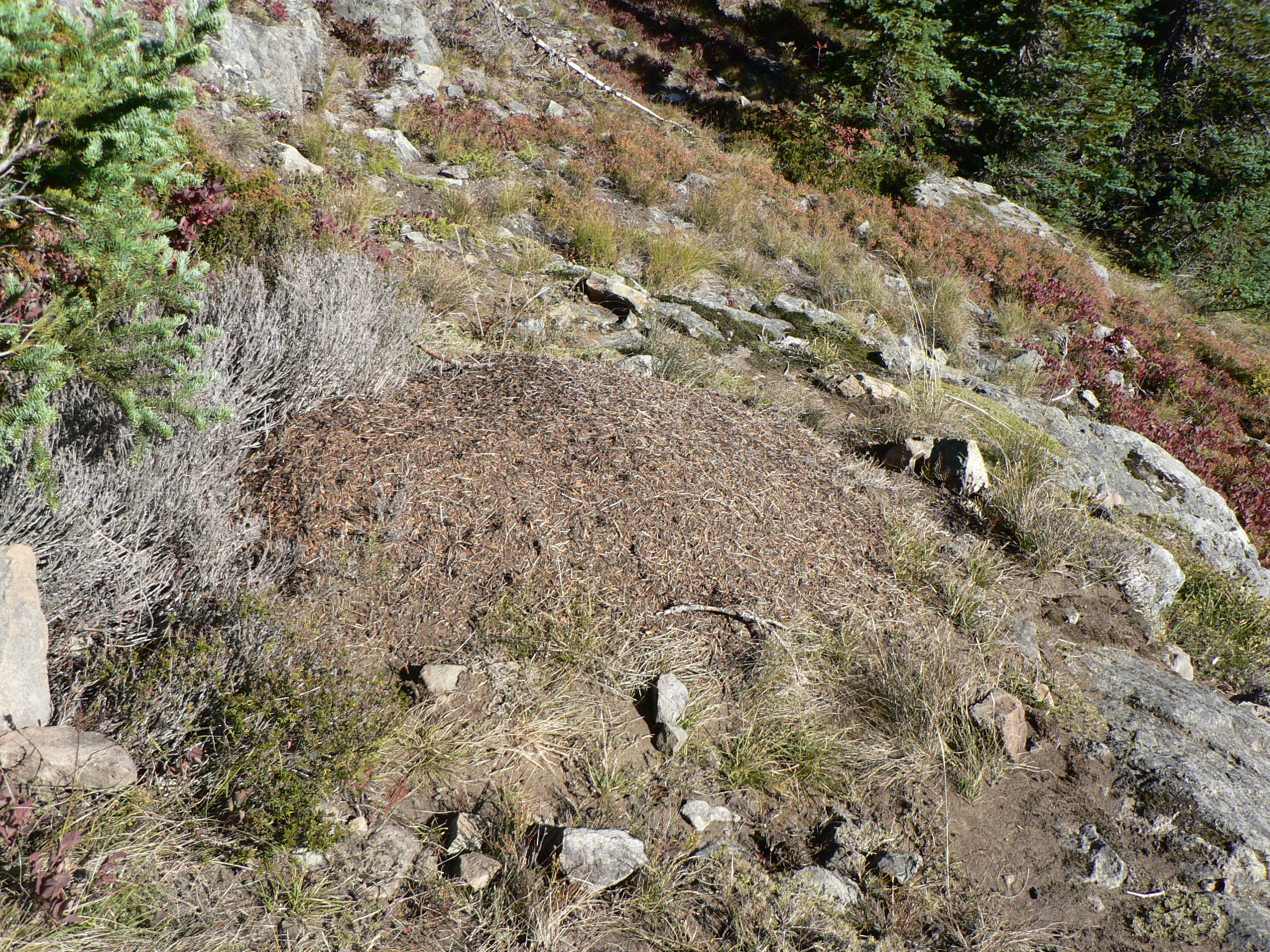
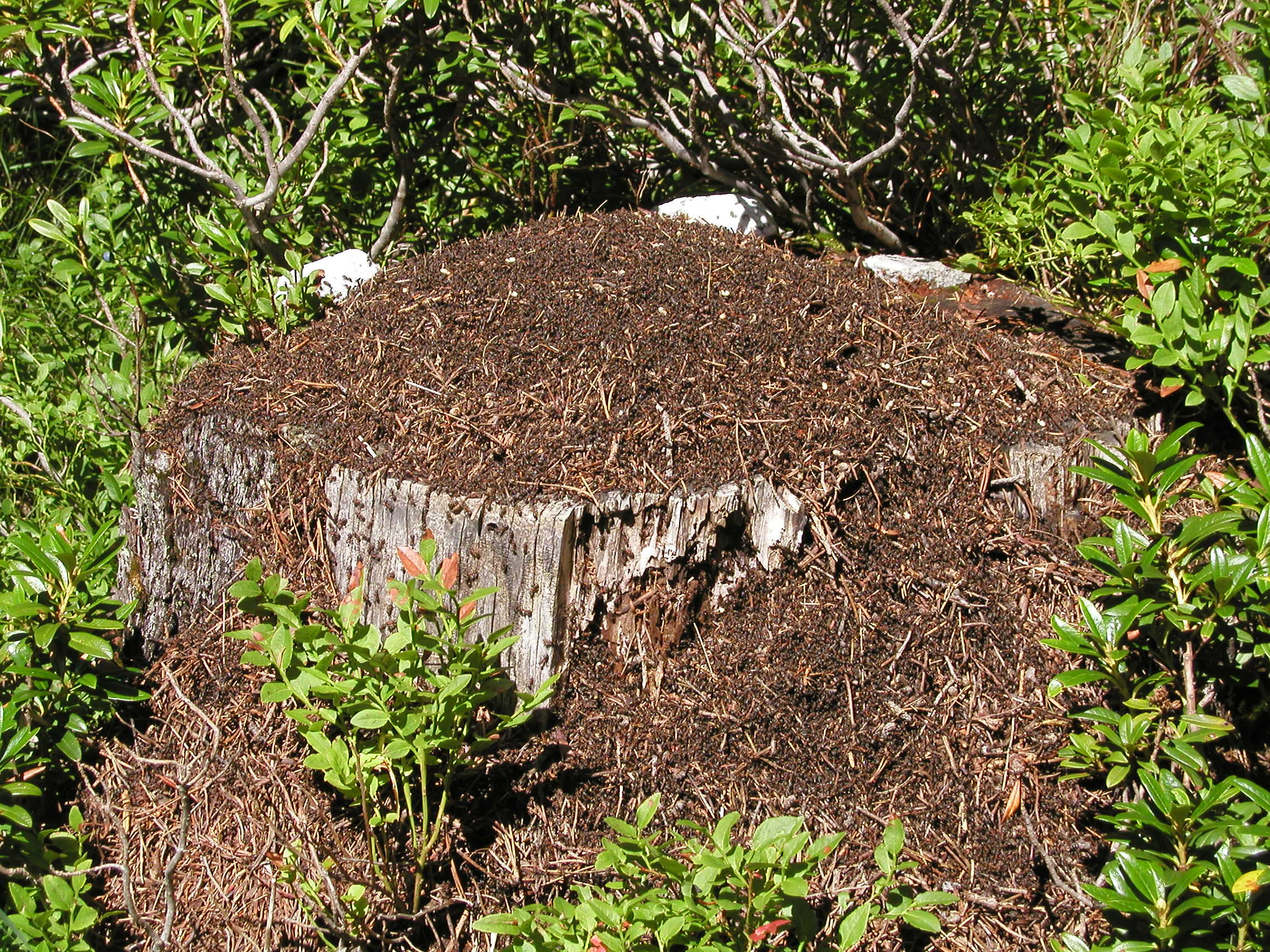
F. obscuripes mound (left) and a Formica mound on a rotting stump with worker ants (right)

Mound-building, forest-dwelling Formica species groups such as F. rufa often have a considerable effect on their environments. They maintain large populations of aphids on the secretions of which they feed, and which the ants defend from other predators. They also prey on other insects. In fact, in many countries, they are introduced in forests to control tree pests, such as Swaine jack pine sawfly and eastern tent caterpillars in North America. The effects of mound-building grassland species such as F. montana are not well-studied, but their local abundance, conspicuous mound-building, and very frequent association with aphids and membracids point to a comparably important ecological role.

Formica nests are of many different types from simple shaft-and-chamber excavations in soil with a small crater or turret of soil above to large mounds, under stones or logs, or in stumps. None is arboreal. The genus is abundant in both the Nearctic and Palearctic regions. Due to their relatively large size and diurnal activity, they are among the more commonly seen ants in northern North America. Some species, including F. rufa, which is common in Southern England, make large, visible thatch nests of dry plant stems, leaves, or conifer needles, usually based around a rotting stump.

Most Formica species are polygynous (have multiple queens per colony), and some are polydomous (have multiple nests belonging to the same colony). Queens may be singly or multiply mated, and may or may not be related. Formica polyctena has polygynous colonies.

Wood ants typically secrete formic acid; F. rufa can squirt the acid from its acidopore several feet if alarmed, a habit which may have given rise to the archaic term for ant, "pismire", and by analogy its American equivalent "piss-ant". They can be relatively large; F. rufa workers can reach a maximum length around 10 mm. The eastern US species F. dolosa and the western F. ravida (syn. F. haemorrhoidalis) may be slightly longer.

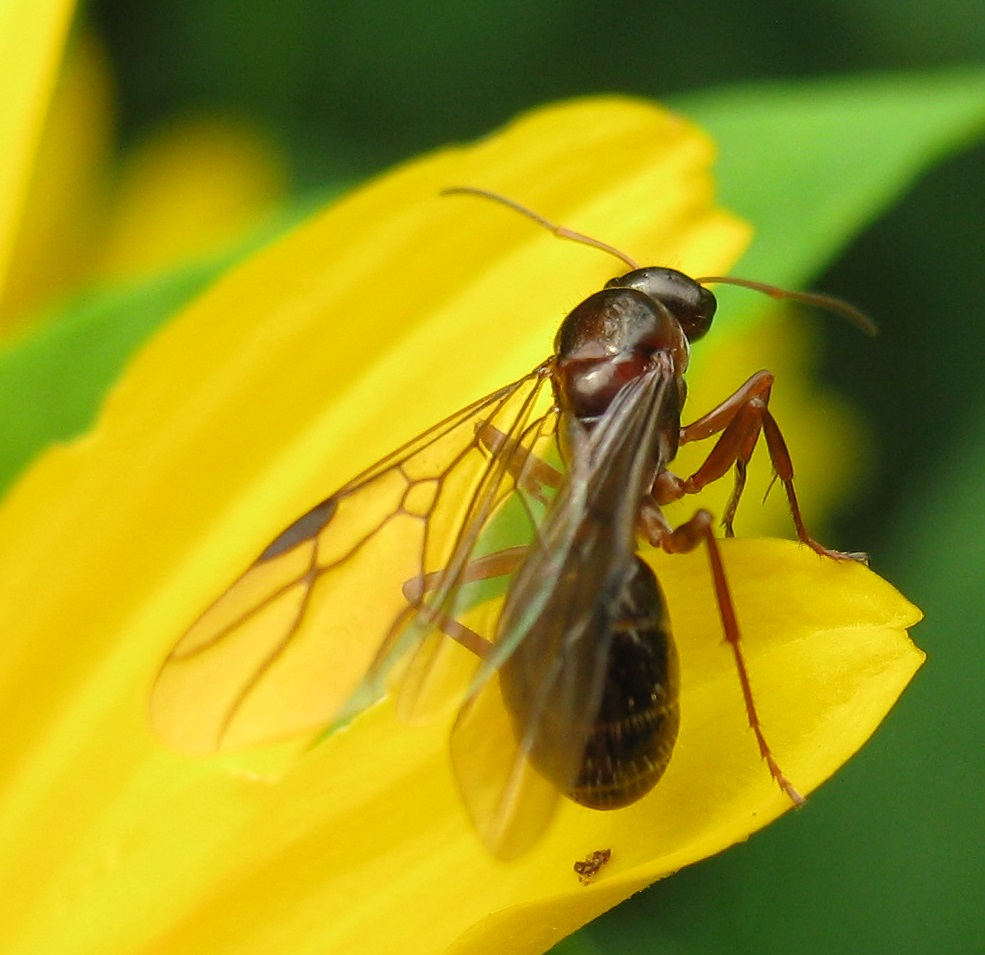
Alate Formica neogagates

== Social characteristics ==
Ants are eusocial organisms – the individuals of the species work together to survive, produce the next generation, and accomplish tasks which cannot be accomplished alone. Unlike other ants, the genus Formica does not have separate castes, which are based on an individual's specialization and morphology. For example, F. selysi, a species native to floodplains, has developed a method to deal with flooding. Individual ants come together to form a living raft to survive the flood. Individual ants tend to take the position in the raft which they held in the past. This return to the same role in the raft is an example of specialization.

=== Social parasitism ===
Formica ants are notable for their socially parasitic behaviors. The three categories are:

- In the F. exsecta and F. rufa-microgyna groups, virgin queens cannot start colonies on their own, but invade colonies of other groups and by various processes eventually oust the host queen and have the host workers help them raise their own brood. Eventually, the colony consists of only the invading queen's offspring. This is called temporary social parasitism.
- In the F. sanguinea group, colonies are started as above, but in some species, workers raid colonies of other groups for new workers to act as a work force. F. sanguinea performs this behavior.

Some species of this group need to do this to survive, for others it is optional.

- The F. pallidefulva, F. neogagates, and F. fusca groups are those most often parasitized by the above groups. They are also captured as workforce by ants of the genus Polyergus. The evolution of this behavior is believed ultimately to have been derived from the common habit of many Formica species of adopting recently mated queens into established colonies. Indeed, in many of the socially parasitic species that do not raid other species, this "secondary polygyny" is common.

== Species ==
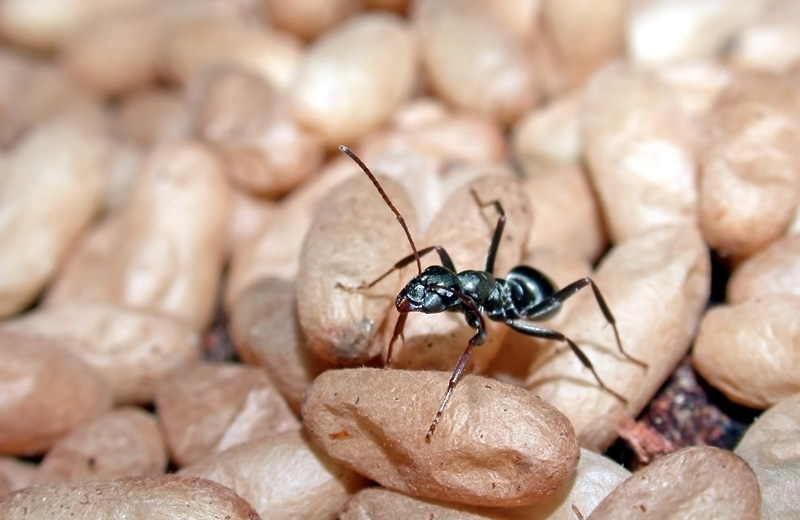
F. accreta worker, with cocoons

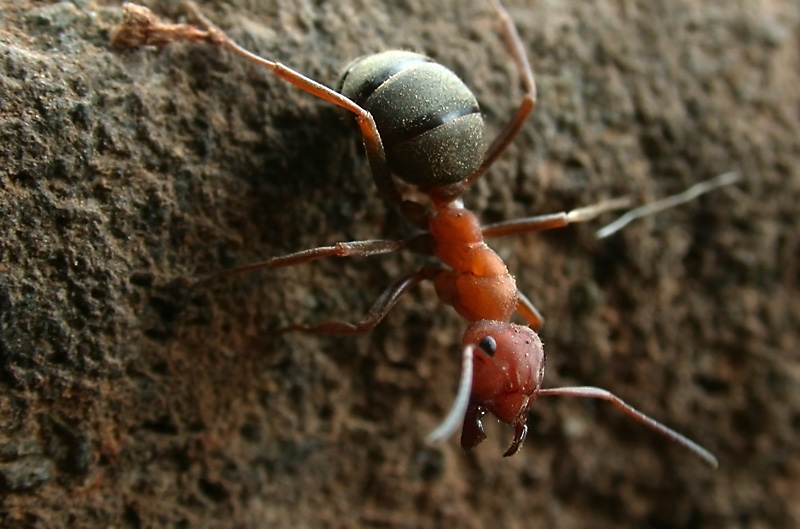
F. integroides worker

As of 2018, Formica contains at least 290 extant species and 59 extinct species.

Species include:

- Formica aquilonia Yarrow, 1955
- †Formica biamoensis Dlussky, Rasnitsyn & Perfilieva, 2015
- Formica cinerea Mayr, 1853
- Formica creightoni Buren, 1968
- Formica cunicularia Latreille, 1798
- Formica dirksi
- Formica exsecta Nylander
- Formica exsectoides
- Formica fusca Linnaeus, 1758 (F. (Serviformica) fusca)
- Formica gagatoides Ruzsky, 1904
- Formica incerta Emery, 1893
- Formica japonica Motschoulsky, 1866
- Formica lasioides
- Formica lemani Bondroit
- Formica lugubris Zetterstedt, 1838
- Formica obscuripes Forel, 1886
- Formica pacifica
- †Formica paleosibirica Dlussky, Rasnitsyn & Perfilieva, 2015
- Formica pallidefulva Latreille, 1802
- Formica podzolica
- Formica polyctena
- Formica pratensis Retzius
- Formica rufa Linnaeus, 1761
- Formica rufibarbis Fabricius, 1793
- Formica sanguinea
- Formica subintegra Wheeler, 1908
- Formica subsericea
- Formica talbotae Wilson, 1977
- Formica transkaucasica Nasonov
- Formica tripartita Théobald, 1937
- Formica truncorum Fabricius, 1804
- Formica uralensis Ruzsky, 1895
