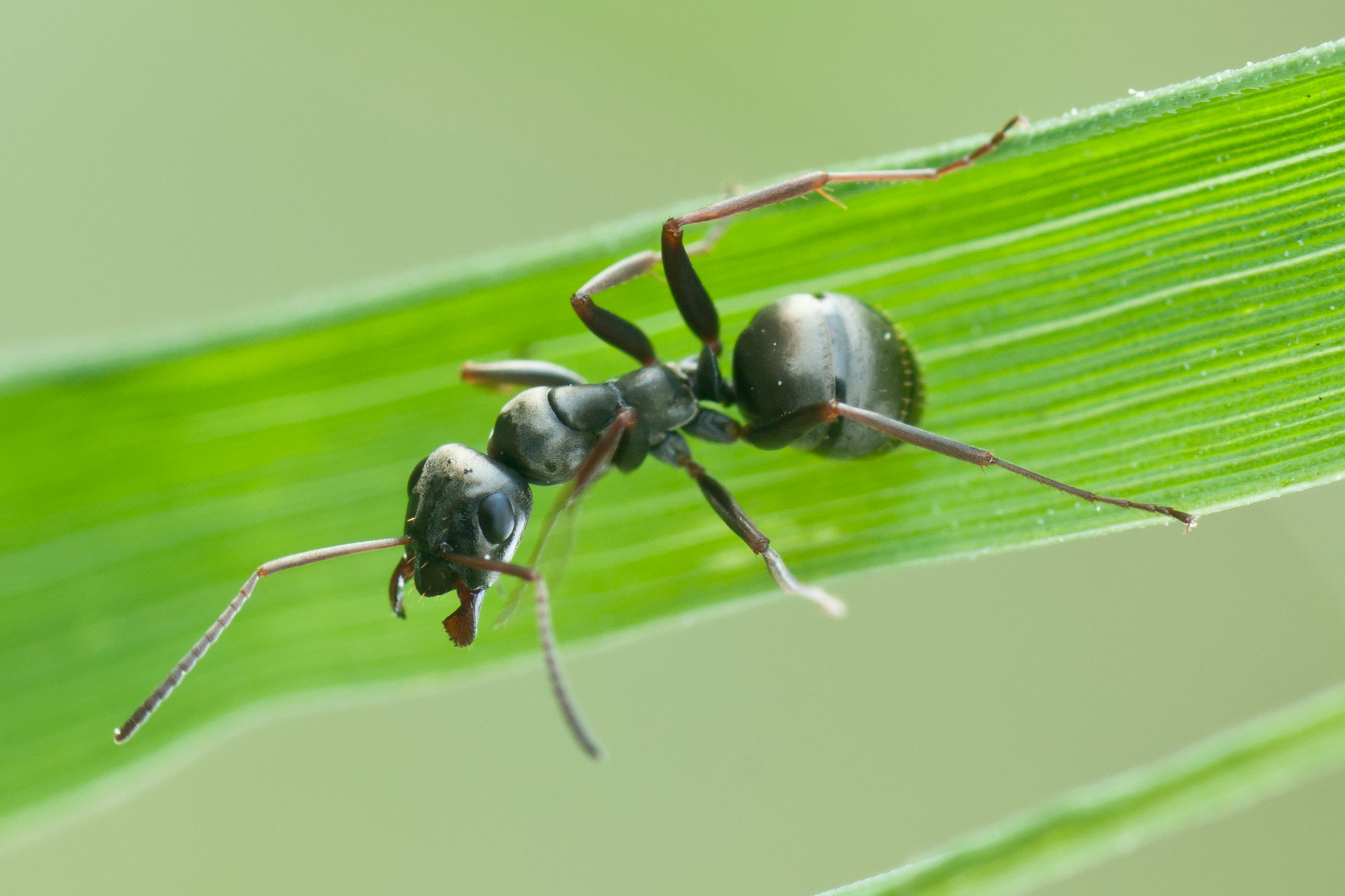

Scientific classification
- Kingdom: Animalia
- Phylum: Arthropoda
- Clade: Pancrustacea
- Class: Insecta
- Order: Hymenoptera
- Family: Formicidae
- Subfamily: Formicinae
- Genus: Formica
- Species: F. fusca

Binomial name
- Formica fusca Linnaeus, 1758

= Formica fusca =

Species of ant

Formica fusca is a black-colored ant commonly found throughout Europe as well as parts of southern Asia and Africa. It has the common names silky ant or dusky ant. The range within the palaearctic region extends from Portugal in the west to Japan in the east and from Italy in the south to Fennoscandia in the north. Populations from North America have been split off as a separate species, Formica subaenescens. F. fusca nests are usually found in rotten tree stumps or under stones in clearcut areas and along woodland borders and hedgerows. The species also often occurs in urban areas, feeding on honeydew secreted by the aphids found on weeds.

== Eusociality ==
Colonies are facultatively polygynous (though weakly so, with a mean number of queen of 3.09); though the queens coexist amicably, contribution to the brood tends to be unequal. Nests are usually small, containing 500–2,000 workers. The workers are large, at 8–10 millimetres (0.3–0.4 in) long, and fast moving, though timid. To ensure that non-nest mate eggs are not reared, these workers will engage in a process known as worker policing. Alate (winged) forms are produced in June/July and nuptial flights are in July/August.

A study has found evidence of nepotism in F. fusca, in contrast with previous experiments with other ant species; this conclusion has been challenged on the grounds that the observed pattern may result from differences in egg viability.

== Ecology ==
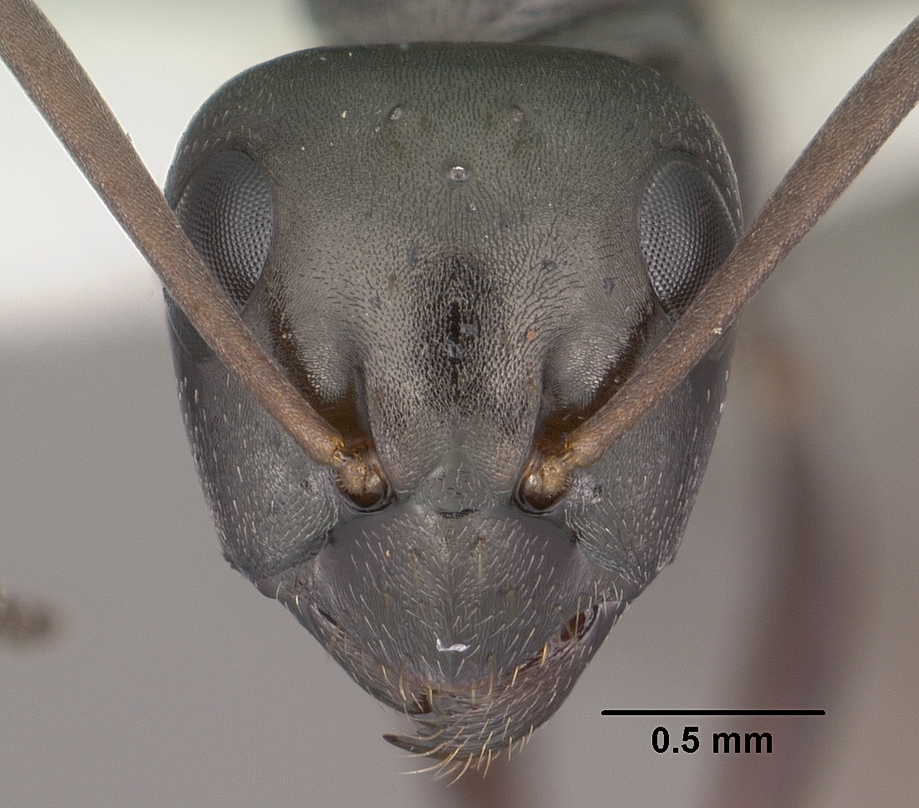
Formica fusca head

F. fusca feeds on small insects such as codling moth larvae, aphid honeydew and extrafloral nectaries. Workers have been found to have a very high resistance to some pathogens and it is thought this may be due to F. fusca utilising the antibiotic properties of their formic acid, additional to the use of their metapleural gland. The larvae of Microdon megalogaster, a member of the ant fly genus, have been observed in the nests of these ants. The inquiline relationship of these fly larvae is not well understood.

== Behaviour ==
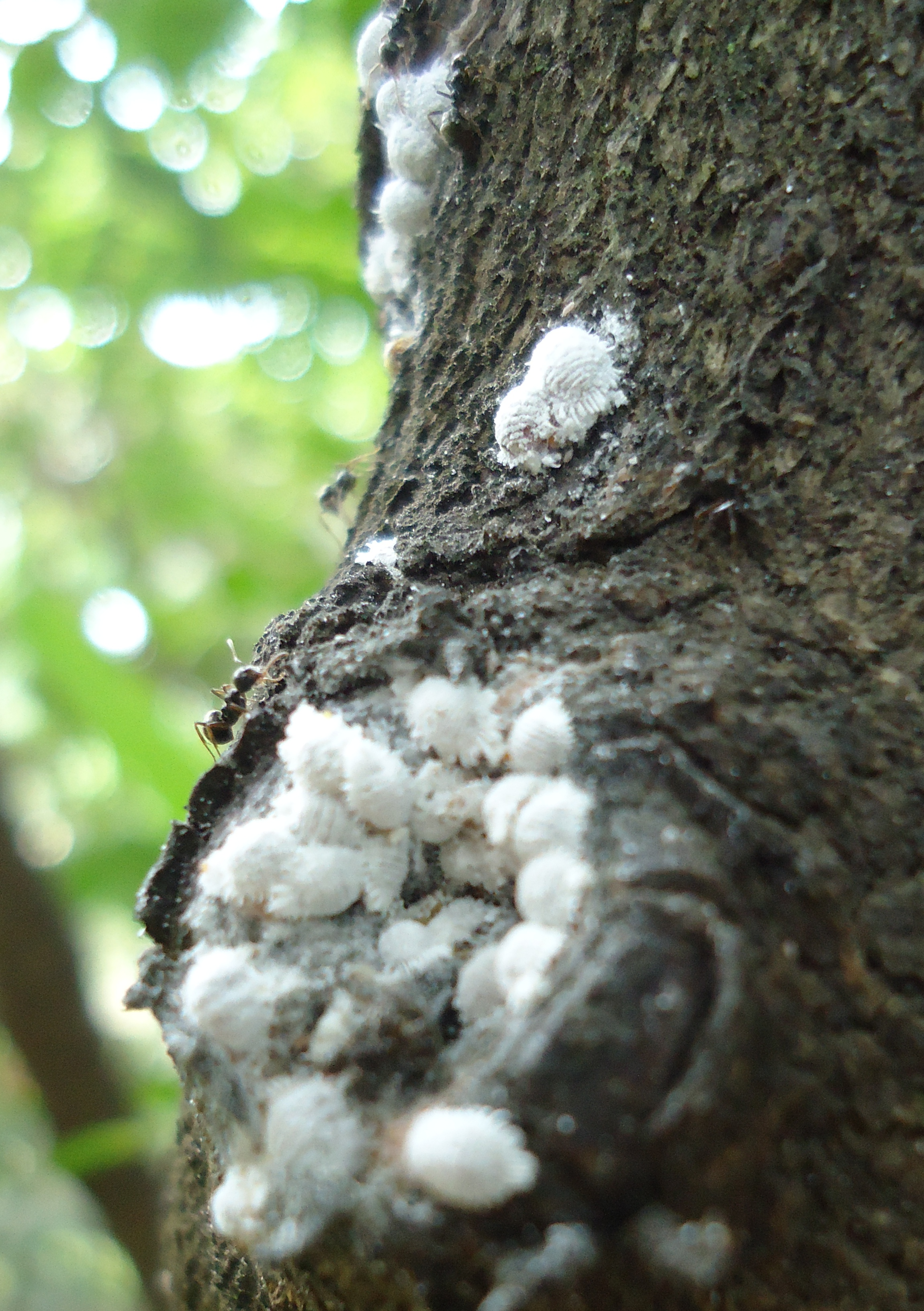
Mutualistic Formica fusca ants tending a herd of mealybugs

=== Learning abilities ===
Workers of this ant species can learn to associate an olfactory stimulus to a reward (sugar solution) during a classical conditioning protocol. The learning abilities of this species were tested using single compounds found in flower emission. Ants are fast to learn, and only a single presentation of the stimulus is enough for them to form a genuine long-term memory. This formed memory is also resistant to extinction.

=== Detection of human cancer cells ===
Ants of this species can also detect volatile organic compounds emitted by cancer cells. After a 3-trial conditioning, they can differentiate cancer cell lines (MCF-7) from healthy ones (MCF-10A). They can also distinguish one cell line (MCF-7) from another cancerous one (MDA-MD-231).

=== Detection of human tumours ===
Later on, these learning abilities were tested using urine from tumour-bearing mice. Mice were grafted with human breast tumours, and the urine was collected and used as a source of odour for learning. Different mice were used between the training and the tests to forbid ants from using individual cues emitted by the mice. In that way, ants had to focus on the presence/absence of tumour, and not on one specific individual odour. Ants were able to detect the presence of human tumours in the urine of the mice, and to distinguish sick individuals from healthy ones.
