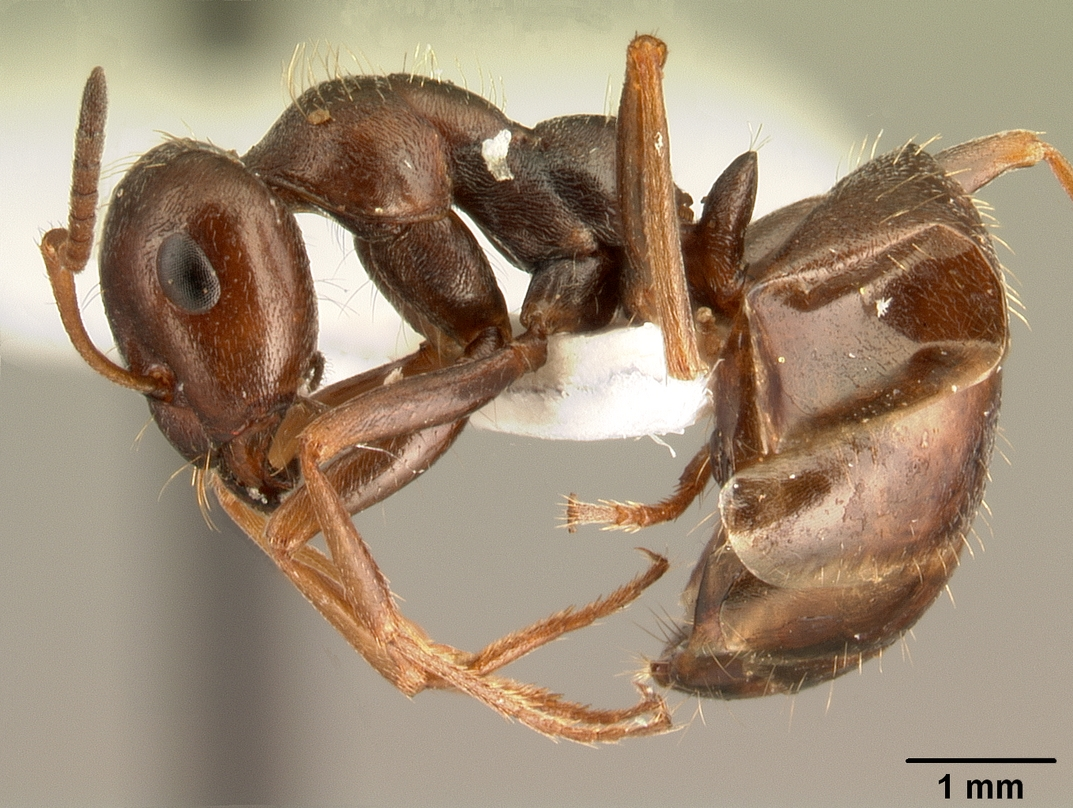
- Proformica nasuta worker from Spain

Scientific classification
- Domain: Eukaryota
- Kingdom: Animalia
- Phylum: Arthropoda
- Class: Insecta
- Order: Hymenoptera
- Family: Formicidae
- Subfamily: Formicinae
- Tribe: Formicini
- Genus: Proformica; Ruzsky, 1902

Type species
- Formica nasuta

Diversity
- 27 species

= Proformica =

Genus of ants

Proformica is a genus of ants in the subfamily Formicinae. The genus is known from the Palearctic realm, from Mongolia through Central Asia to Spain. Colonies are small, generally containing a few hundred individuals, with a single queen (monogyne) or multiple ergatogyne queens. Unique in the tribe Formicini, some species have specialized workers ("honeypot ants") gorged with food; they function as living storage containers.

== Parasite host ==
Four species are host to obligate slave-making ants in the genus Rossomyrmex, with each species forming a coevolving pair:

- Rossomyrmex proformicarum–Proformica epinotalis
- Rossomyrmex quandratinodum–Proformica sp.
- Rossomyrmex anatolicus–Proformica korbi
- Rossomyrmex minuchae–Proformica longiseta

== Species ==
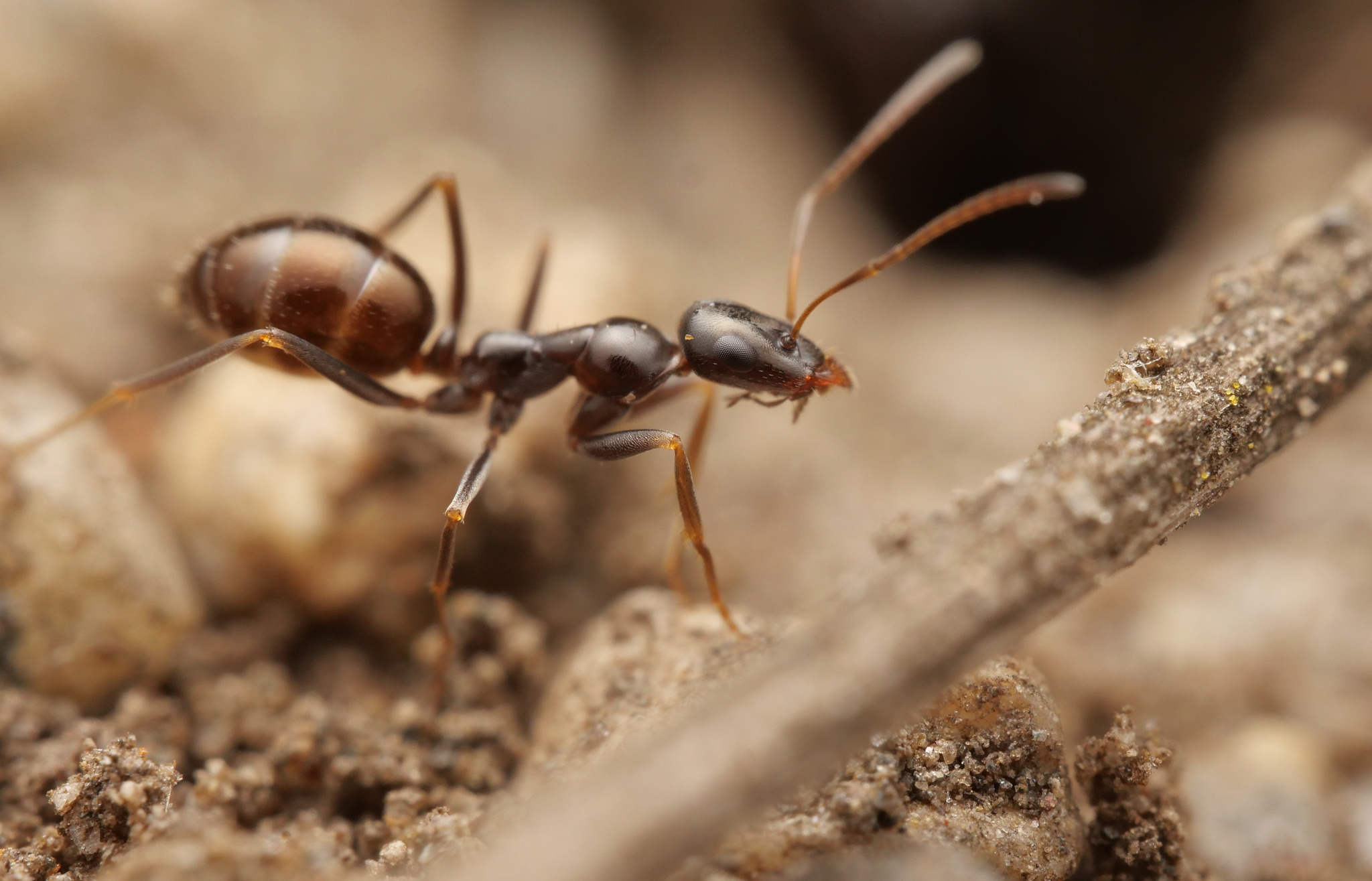
P. striaticeps from Greece
- Proformica alaica Kuznetsov-Ugamsky, 1926
- Proformica borowieci Lebas, Galkowski, Lenoir & Perdereau, 2023
- Proformica buddhaensis Ruzsky, 1915
- Proformica caucasea (Santschi, 1925)
- Proformica coriacea Kuznetsov-Ugamsky, 1927
- Proformica dolichocephala Kuznetsov-Ugamsky, 1927
- Proformica epinotalis Kuznetsov-Ugamsky, 1927
- Proformica ferreri Bondroit, 1918
- Proformica flavosetosa (Viehmeyer, 1922)
- Proformica jacoti (Wheeler, 1923)
- Proformica kaszabi Dlussky, 1969
- Proformica kobachidzei Arnol'di, 1968
- Proformica korbi (Emery, 1909)
- Proformica kosswigi (Donisthorpe, 1950)
- Proformica kusnezowi (Santschi, 1928)
- Proformica lebasi Borowiec & Salata, 2022
- Proformica longiseta Collingwood, 1978
- Proformica mongolica (Emery, 1901)
- Proformica nasuta (Nylander, 1856)
- Proformica nitida Kuznetsov-Ugamsky, 1923
- Proformica oculatissima (Forel, 1886)
- Proformica ossetica Dubovikoff, 2005
- Proformica pilosiscapa Dlussky, 1969
- Proformica seraphimi Tarbinsky, 1970
- Proformica similis Dlussky, 1969
- Proformica splendida Dlussky, 1965
- Proformica striaticeps (Forel, 1911)

== See also ==
- Rossomyrmex, genus of ant that parasitizes Proformica species
