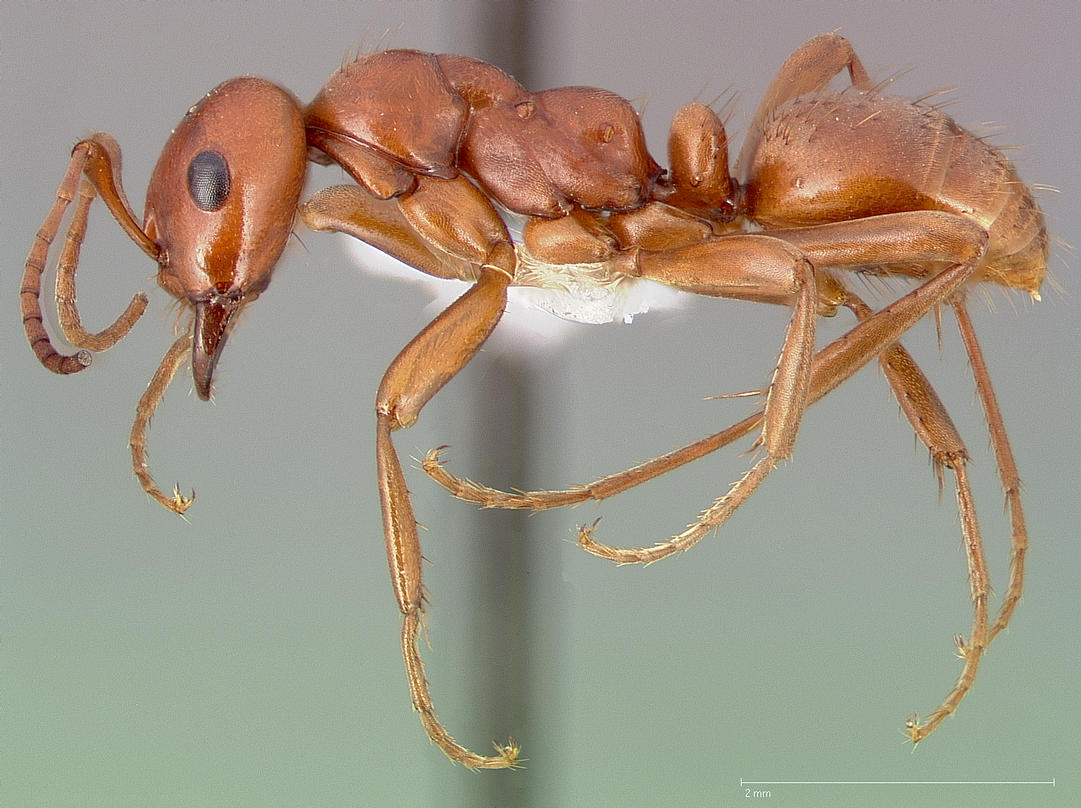
- Polyergus mexicanus

Scientific classification
- Domain: Eukaryota
- Kingdom: Animalia
- Phylum: Arthropoda
- Class: Insecta
- Order: Hymenoptera
- Family: Formicidae
- Subfamily: Formicinae
- Genus: Polyergus
- Species: P. mexicanus

Binomial name
- Polyergus mexicanus Forel, 1899

= Polyergus mexicanus =

Species of ant

Polyergus mexicanus is a species of slave-making ant in the subfamily Formicinae. It is the most widely distributed species of Polyergus in North America. It is an obligatory social parasite, unable to feed itself or look after the colony and reliant on ants of another species, Formica, to undertake these tasks. The parasitic ants are known as "dulotics" (from the Greek δοῦλος doulos, meaning a slave) and the ants they parasitise are known as "hosts".

== Taxonomy ==
In a revision of the genus Polyergus in 2013, Trager reinstated five species previously thought to be synonymous with Polyergus breviceps. P. mexicanus was one of these, a widely distributed species found in western North American and originally described by the Swiss myrmecologist Auguste Forel in 1899, the type locality being Mexico. It is likely that most species mentioned in scientific journals as P. breviceps are in fact P. mexicanus.

== Description ==
Polyergus mexicanus is somewhat variable across its range and averages 6 millimetres (0.24 in) in total length. The head is glossy in the south of its range and more matte in eastern and northern populations. The mesonotum is matte dorsally and usually shining laterally. The gaster is also shining but this is partially concealed by a covering of short erect hairs, especially dorsally. The colour is generally red with the posterior portion of the tergites being tinged with brown. The legs may be a slightly darker colour than the body, and the hairs on the dorsal surface are grey, never yellowish as they are in P. breviceps. This species also bears longer brownish macrosetae (hairs) but they often get worn away, leaving dark scars on the tergites.

== Distribution and habitat ==
Polyergus mexicanus is the most widely distributed species in the genus Polyergus in North America. It is native to the western United States and Canada, North Dakota, South Dakota, Arkansas and Mexico. It usually inhabits open woodland with little undergrowth or mixed wood and grassland habitats. Further south it is restricted to higher altitudes; in the Chiricahua Mountains of Mexico it occurs at 2,200 metres (7,200 ft) and in Chihuahua is found at 2,800 metres (9,200 ft), typically in open coniferous forests.

== Behaviour ==
Polyergus mexicanus is an obligate parasite of other species of ant. These "hosts" are species of Formica ants in the groups F. fusca and F. neogagates. A newly mated female of P. mexicanus enters the nest of a potential host, employing pheromones to subdue the resident workers. She then kills the existing Formica queen and becomes accepted by the Formica workers. These then proceed to rear her brood as well as maintaining the nest and feeding the dulotic queen and the ants which develop from the eggs she lays. The dulotic ants are unable to carry out these tasks themselves.

The workforce of the colony is periodically replenished by a raid being undertaken on another nearby colony of Formica ants. The raid is made by the Polyergus worker ants and usually takes place on a hot afternoon in the summer. A scout ant locates a suitable target nest and a column of dulotic ants move towards it. On arriving at the nest they may mill around for a while, perhaps clearing debris such as small stones or twigs away from the entrance. They then surge inside and quickly begin to emerge carrying host pupae, prepupae and sometimes late-stage larvae back to the dulotic nest. There, the host workers care for them as well as the dulotic young developing from eggs laid by the Polyergus queen. Newly mated female dulotics may take advantage of raids to enter host colonies during the chaotic situation that exists during a raid.
