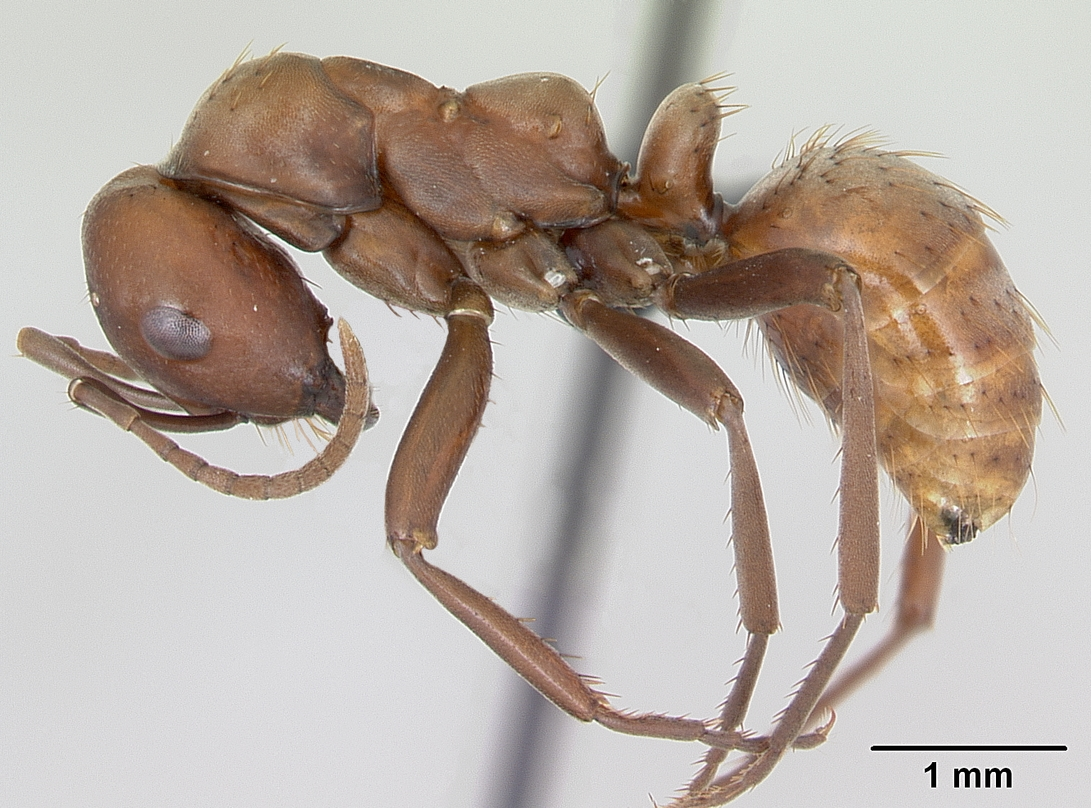

Scientific classification
- Kingdom: Animalia
- Phylum: Arthropoda
- Clade: Pancrustacea
- Class: Insecta
- Order: Hymenoptera
- Family: Formicidae
- Subfamily: Formicinae
- Genus: Polyergus
- Species: P. rufescens

Binomial name
- Polyergus rufescens (Latreille, 1798)

Synonyms
- Formica rufescens Latreille, 1798 Polyergus testacea (Fabricius, 1804)

= Polyergus rufescens =

Species of ant

Polyergus rufescens is a species of slave-making ant native to southern Europe and parts of Asia, commonly referred to as the European Amazon ant or as the slave-making ant. It is an obligatory social parasite, unable to feed itself or look after the colony and reliant on ants of another species to undertake these tasks. To replenish these servant ants, it raids nearby ant colonies and carries home pupae and larvae, and these are reared to provide future workers for the colony. A newly mated female P. rufescens needs to make its way into one of these "host" nests, kill the host queen, and be accepted by the host workers in her place.

== Description ==
P. rufescens workers in western and southwestern Europe are dark red, while eastern specimens are more orange-red. Darker ants often have a purplish or brownish tinge to their gasters and appendages. Morphologically, ants of this species are similar to the Mexican Polyergus topoffi, but have narrower heads and petioles and the first tergites of their gasters are more hairy. The total length of this ant is 4.7 to 7 mm (0.19 to 0.28 in).

== Distribution ==
P. rufescens is native to parts of Europe including Spain, France, the Netherlands, Germany, Switzerland, Austria, Bulgaria, Italy, Croatia, Serbia, and Slovenia. Its range also extends into Asia as far east as the mountains of Kyrgyzstan, Kazakhstan, and western China. Its habitat is typically open, sparse grassland, wherever its host species are to be found. The host species vary in different parts of the range and include F. cunicularia, F. fusca, F. rufibarbis, F. clara, F. gagates, and F. cinerea. The main host species in the eastern part of the range is F. clara and in general, the species chosen is the one most abundant in the locality or that can be raided with the least mortality.

== Behaviour ==
This species is known as the slave-making ant because, like Formica sanguinea, it raids the nests of other species of ant in the subgenus Serviformica and carries their brood back to the dulotic nest (from Greek δοῦλος doulos, "slave"). A mature Polyergus colony always originated as a colony of the slave species (the hosts), and the worker population is maintained by the raiding sorties of the Amazon ants. In the dulotic nest, the Formica workers usually outnumber the Amazon ant population by at least five to one and in general, the behaviour of the mixed colony resembles that of a large colony of the host species. Molecular analysis has shown that although the two slave-making ant genera Polyergus and Rossomyrmex are closely related, they are even more closely related to their respective host species and the enslaving behaviour has evolved independently.

Pierre Huber, the son of the Swiss entomologist François Huber, studied the behaviour of these ants. The P. rufescens workers perform no work apart from nest raiding. So reliant are they on their slaves that without their help, they are incapable of feeding themselves or rearing the young. Huber experimentally put 30 of the slave-making ants in a box with some of their larvae, some pupae, a little soil, and a generous supply of honey. Within two days, half of these ants were dead, presumably of starvation. He then introduced one slave ant into the box. It very soon "established order, formed a chamber in the earth, gathered together the larvae, extricated several young ants that were ready to quit the condition of pupae, and preserved the life of the remaining Amazons."

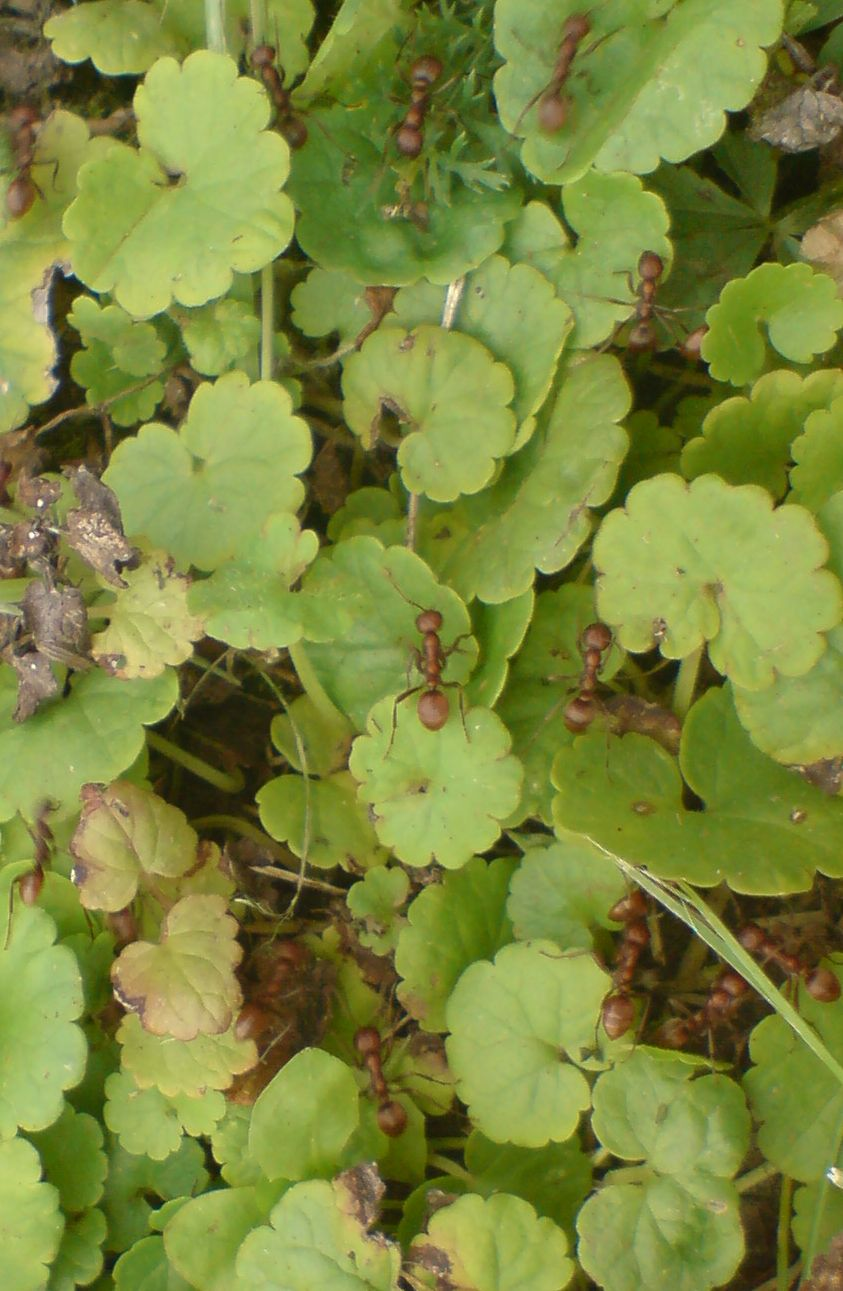
Column of marching ants

Winged males and females known as alates emerge from the colonies in summer. Some colonies produce alates of both sexes, and in these the males emerge and fly off some days before the females do. Nuptial flights involving both males and females often occur, but males usually depart from any particular nest first and this prevents inbreeding. Observations on the ground show that the female makes certain movements of her mandibles just before mating, and this is thought to release a sexually attractive pheromone. Some females copulate immediately after the nuptial flight, others mate on the ground near the dulotic nest without taking to the air, and a few mate during the course of a slave raid. The female alates lose their wings within a few minutes of mating, and unless involved in a raid, then hide in the undergrowth near their nests. Others set out alone, probably following the trail of a previous slave raid, and are greeted with hostility at any potential target nest they encounter. The majority join a slave raid within a few days of mating, but only some of these attempt to infiltrate the target colony, others returning home with the raiders. Some winged females also accompany the raiders, and a few of these have been observed returning home carrying a cocoon.

A newly mated female is unable to found a new colony unaided because she is not able to feed herself or care for her first brood. Instead, she enters the nest of another species of ants. She may join a column of raiding ants and use the panic and confusion surrounding their attack on the target colony to infiltrate the nest. She emits a secretion from the Dufour's gland on her abdomen (named after its discoverer, Léon Jean Marie Dufour), which includes a pheromone which subdues the attacked ants and makes them less aggressive. She seeks out the colony's queen and kills her by biting her with her piercing mandibles. With their queen gone, the behaviour of the resident ants changes and their attacks lessen in ferocity and alternate with periods of grooming the new arrival. Within a few hours, the usurping queen is accepted and is surrounded by submissive workers that groom her and feed her.
