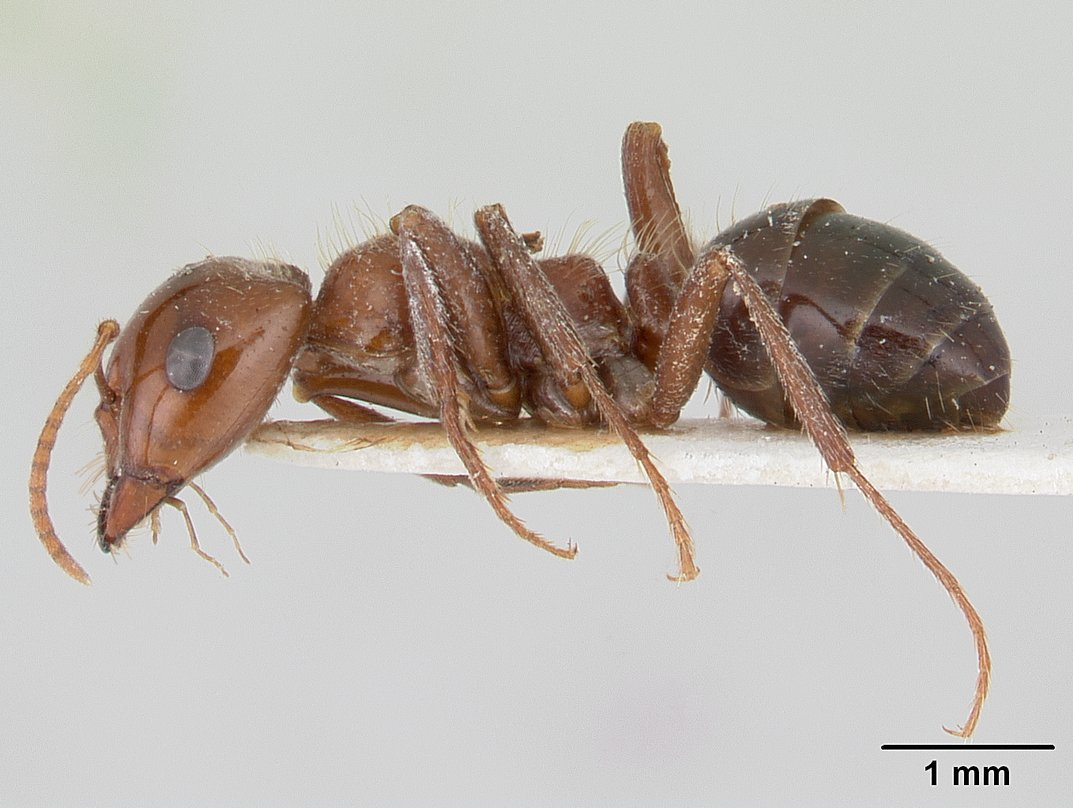
- R. proformicarum worker from Russia

Scientific classification
- Kingdom: Animalia
- Phylum: Arthropoda
- Class: Insecta
- Order: Hymenoptera
- Family: Formicidae
- Subfamily: Formicinae
- Tribe: Formicini
- Genus: Rossomyrmex; Arnol'di, 1928

Type species
- Rossomyrmex proformicarum Arnol'di, 1928

Diversity
- 4 species

= Rossomyrmex =

Genus of ants

Rossomyrmex is a genus of slave-making ant in the subfamily Formicinae. The genus consists of four species, each with a single host from the genus Proformica, and has a very wide range of distribution from China to southeastern Spain, from huge extended plains to the top of high mountains.

== Species ==
- Rossomyrmex anatolicus Tinaut, 2007 – Turkey
- Rossomyrmex minuchae Tinaut, 1981 – Spain
- Rossomyrmex proformicarum Arnol'di, 1928 – Caucasus and Volga plains, Russia
- Rossomyrmex quandratinodum Xia & Zheng, 1995 – Kazakhstan and China

== Distribution ==
The Asian parasite-host pairs live mostly in extended plains whereas the Spanish pair R. minuchae–P. longiseta inhabits the top of three high mountains in southern Spain. Despite this apparent difference in habitat (extended plains versus high mountains), the abiotic conditions are quite similar and are consistent with a typical arid steppe. However, the main difference comes from the fact that the Spanish populations are small and are geographically isolated from each other.

== Slave-making ==
Rossomyrmex is one of two obligate slave-making genera in the subfamily Formicinae, the other being Polyergus. Both genera evolved slave-making behavior independently and are close phylogenetic relatives. However, they are more closely related to the genera they parasitize than to each other, and Rossomyrmex is more closely related to Cataglyphis than to Polyergus.

=== Parasite–host pairs ===
Each parasite species has a single host from the genus Proformica, thus forming unique coevolving pairs:

- Rossomyrmex proformicarum–Proformica epinotalis
- Rossomyrmex quandratinodum–Proformica sp.
- Rossomyrmex anatolicus–Proformica korbi
- Rossomyrmex minuchae–Proformica longiseta

=== Raids ===
Parasitized nests need to replenish the host workers periodically, and this is done by raiding. The standard process is that after finding a new host nest to invade, the parasite worker marks the way to its nest with pheromones, and afterward fellow slave-makers begin to attract in a few seconds. Then they go quickly to the targeted host nest, attack it, and carry as many larvae and pupae as possible and return to their nest following the same trail marked by the pheromone. Workers of the attacked nest can fight or flee although, in Proformica, the most common behavior is flight probably because hosts always lose fights. Rossomyrmex is the only reported slave-maker that exclusively uses adult transport and single recruitment chain instead of pheromones during raids. This behavior is probably constrained by the arid habitat: raids take place in early summer when soil surface temperature can reach up to 30 °C, a temperature for which pheromones would quickly evaporate. This condition imposes that Rossomyrmex raids appear as less efficient than those carried out with pheromones; this, together with the usually flee behavior of the Proformica hosts permits the survival of several attacked nests. Finally, another important difference in the raiding behavior of Rossomyrmex is that the return to the parasite nest with the robbed brood takes place on the following day of the assault instead of later in the same day.

== Reproduction ==
The reproductive behavior of slave-making ants usually consists of synchronous emergence of sexuals followed by a nuptial flight and the invasion of a host nest, but also in some cases females display a mating call around the natal nest to attract males and immediately after mating search for a host nest to usurp. However, the reproductive strategy of Rossomyrmex greatly differs from the one described above. Males and females emerge from the natal nest at a different time during the day and males always fly away shortly after their emergence. Virgin females of Rossomyrmex show a typical mating call behavior near the natal nest but due to the scarce number of nests and that sexuals are not produced every year in all nests, some females remain virgin and cannot produce new nests despite performing sexual calling chorus for several days. When a male arrives at a female-calling nest, he will mate to as many females as possible, being one of the few cases known of polygamous males in ants, especially when mating occurs out of the nest. In contrast, females are monandrous although there are some reported cases of multiply mated queens. Females recently mated always run to hide in their natal nest after the first copulation and do not seek for subsequent mating. This reproductive behavior seems to be constrained by the low production of sexuals, especially males (which gives advantage to female-calling behavior rather than nuptial flights and multiple mating by males).

Newly mated queens search for a host nest to invade and they are unchallenged by host workers and queens thanks to the repellent effect of the Dufour's gland that they have highly inflated before the usurpation. After taking over the host nest by killing the resident queens, the size of this gland decreases. This strategy to invade a host nest contrasts with other extended strategy consisting in newly mated queens embarking in a slave raid with workers, which would facilitate the penetration of the host nest immersed in chaos.

In the Proformica-Rossomyrmex system, dispersal ability is quite different for host and parasite species. Proformica is generally polygynous (multiple queen colonies) with wingless queens that found new nests by budding; therefore they are likely to show restricted dispersal and strong population structure, while Rossomyrmex is monogynous (single queen colonies), with both sexes winged and show independent colony founding.
