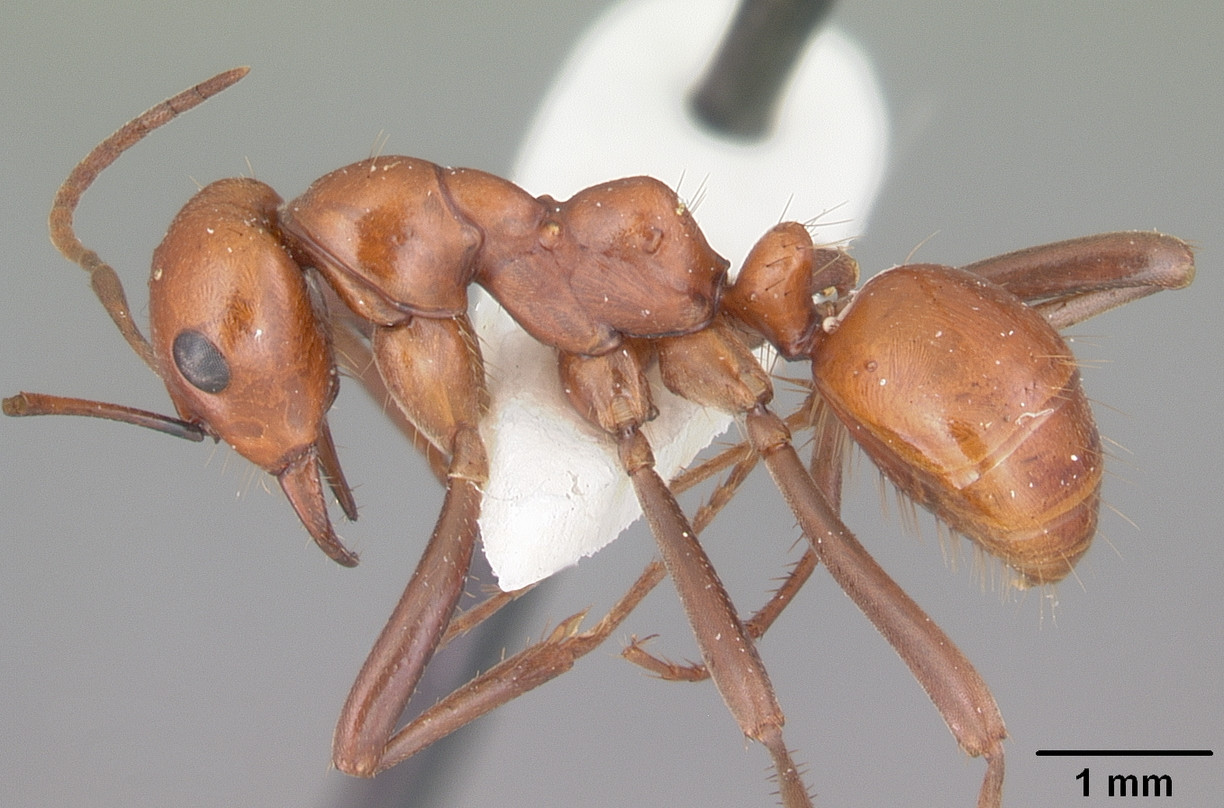

Conservation status
- Vulnerable (IUCN 2.3)

Scientific classification
- Kingdom: Animalia
- Phylum: Arthropoda
- Class: Insecta
- Order: Hymenoptera
- Family: Formicidae
- Subfamily: Formicinae
- Genus: Polyergus
- Species: P. lucidus

Binomial name
- Polyergus lucidus Mayr, 1870

= Polyergus lucidus =

Species of ant

Polyergus lucidus is a species of slave-making ant in the subfamily Formicinae endemic to the eastern United States. It is an obligatory social parasite, unable to feed itself or look after its brood and reliant on ants of another species of the genus Formica to undertake these tasks. Parasitic ants are known as "dulotics" (from the Greek δοῦλος doulos, meaning a slave) and the ants they parasitise are known as "hosts".

== Description ==
P. lucidus is part of a group of six orange-red or dark-red species of ants, mostly from eastern North America, that have long, often dark-coloured appendages and few hairs on the dorsal surface of the gaster. The worker is 5.7 to 7.1 mm (0.22 to 0.28 in) long and has a head longer than it is wide, crowned with about a dozen short setae (bristles). It is red with the legs and the tip of the gaster often being tinged with brown. The specific name lucidus means "shiny" and this ant is the shiniest in the group and has a glossy mesonotum and gaster, and a moderately shiny head.

== Behaviour ==
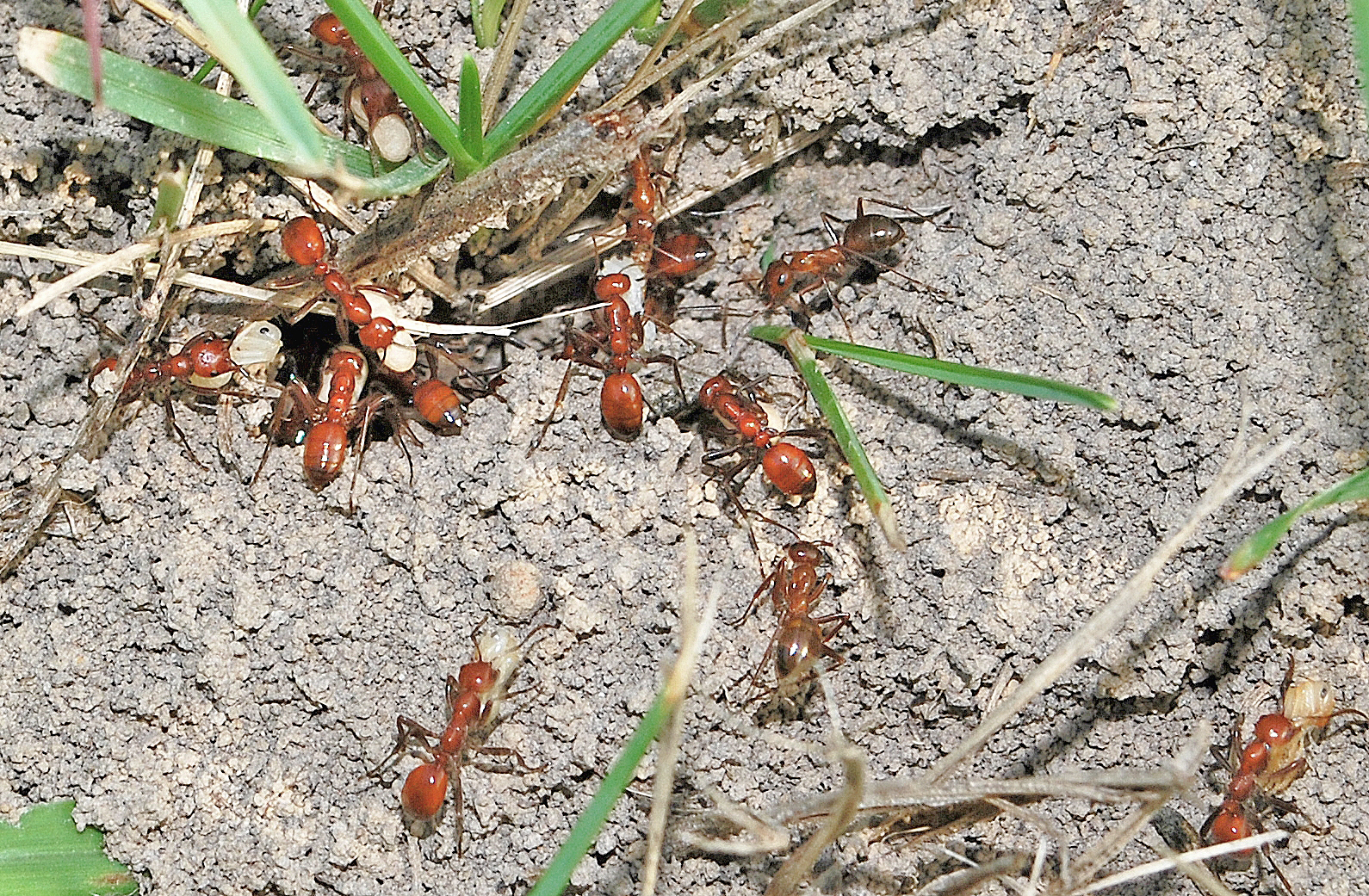
P. lucidus raiding a F. incerta nest

P. lucidus is incapable of feeding itself or rearing its young without assistance. Like other members of its genus, it raids the nests of another species of ants and carries off the pupae to be reared in the dulotic nest where, when they emerge, they function as workers. In the case of P. lucidus, the host species is Formica incerta, and reports of Formica pallidefulva and Formica schaufussi in dulotic nests of P. lucidus, e.g., result from misidentifications, corrected in Trager's work. Colonies of P. lucidus and its close relatives only raid nests of the slave species already present in the dulotic nest, an early clue that these host specialists might, in fact, be separate species. On the odd occasion when the nest of a different ant species was raided, the pupae brought back to the dulotic nest were likely to be consumed. In the past, it was suggested that worker dulotics obtain their preferences by imprinting, but it is now deemed more likely the host preference is an innate, evolved trait of each species.

== Distribution ==
P. lucidus is native to the eastern United States and occurs almost everywhere that its host species is found. Its range extends from New England and Wisconsin southwards to the Carolinas and Missouri, but it is absent from Kansas and Nebraska. It is generally found in prairies, pastures, and old fields.
