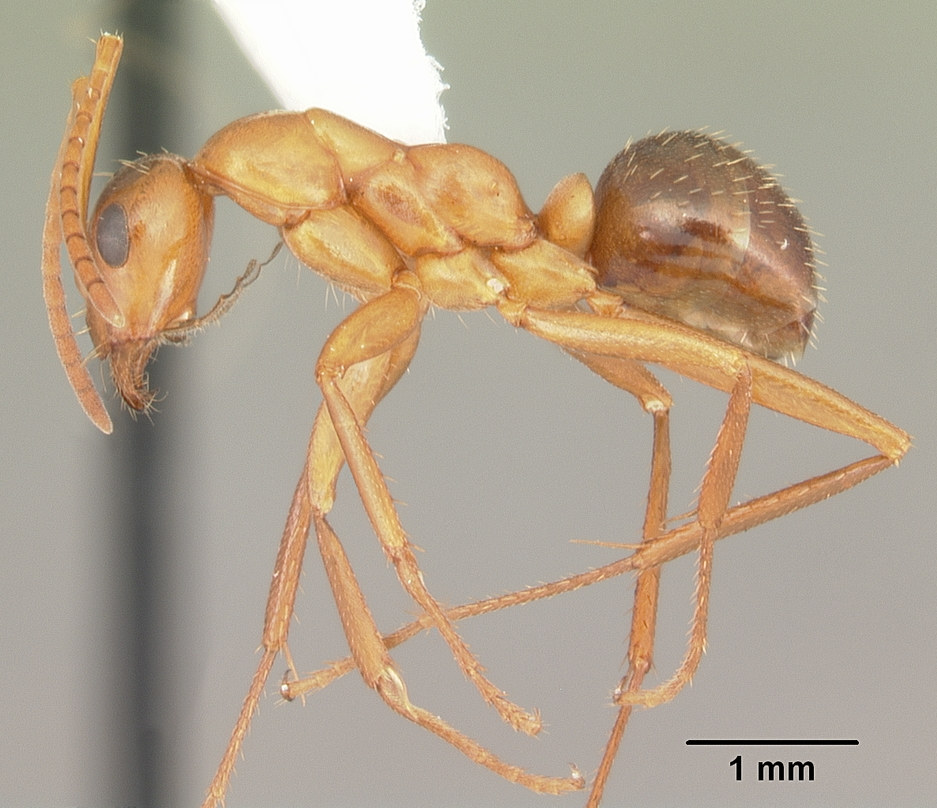
- Formica pallidefulva worker

Scientific classification
- Kingdom: Animalia
- Phylum: Arthropoda
- Clade: Pancrustacea
- Class: Insecta
- Order: Hymenoptera
- Family: Formicidae
- Subfamily: Formicinae
- Genus: Formica
- Species: F. pallidefulva

Binomial name
- Formica pallidefulva Latreille, 1802

Synonyms
- Formica succinea Creighton, 1950; Formica nitidiventris; Formica schaufussi

= Formica pallidefulva =

Species of ant

Formica pallidefulva (a field ant) is a species of ant found in North America. It is a red to dark brown ant with a shiny body, and varies in shade across its range. Colonies of this ant are found in a variety of habitats, where they excavate underground nests with galleries and chambers. In some parts of its range, the nests may be raided by slave-making ants, most notably Formica pergandei and Polyergus montivagus.

== Description ==
The workers of F. pallidefulva are very similar in appearance to those of F. incerta, but are more glossy. They have little pubescence on the mesosoma and the gaster has only a scant covering of short hairs. This ant is very variable in colour. Northern populations are deep brownish-black, but southern types are bright, coppery yellow, and various intermediate colour combinations occur in the central part of its range. Even among the workers of a colony, a considerable degree of variation exists in colouring, but none of these variations seems to be taxonomically significant.

== Distribution and habitat ==
F. pallidefulva is found in eastern North America from southeastern Canada and the eastern United States westwards to the Great Plains and the foothills of the Rocky Mountains from Wyoming to New Mexico. It is a common species and is found in a variety of habitats, including grassland, woodland, forest, rough ground, lawns, parks and campuses.

== Behaviour ==
The nest of F. pallidefulva is excavated below ground and consists of one or more horizontal galleries near the surface from which descend one or two vertical galleries about 1 cm (0.4 in) in diameter and up to 60 centimetres (24 in) long. A typical nest has about 18 chambers in which the ants live, radiating off the horizontal and vertical galleries and measuring about 4 by 2.5 cm (2 by 1 in), each having a level floor and domed roof. The entrance is inconspicuous and up to 2.5 cm (1 in) in diameter, sometimes in open ground and sometimes concealed. About a quarter of the nests have two entrances. A mound is not usually seen on the surface above the nest, but a newly excavated entrance may be surrounded by a halo of ejected soil. In forested areas, nests may be dug under bark on old tree stumps or in rotten logs, and in grassland, a small mound may be formed above a nest in or beside a clump of grass.

F. pallidefulva is diurnal and worker ants spend the night in the nest and emerge from the nest in the morning to forage. In many nests, about three-quarters of the larvae are not enclosed in a cocoon when they pupate, but the proportion varies from nest to nest and from year to year. Male and female alates emerge from larvae that have overwintered and pupated in late spring. They fly in late summer, having emerged from the nest a few at a time, and launched themselves into the air individually. The flights generally take place in the morning around the time the sun reaches the nest. When a newly fertilised female alights, she breaks off her wings and excavates a small chamber in which to lay her eggs. She remains there, feeding the larvae that hatch on regurgitated food, and the first batch of workers is stunted through lack of adequate nourishment. More eggs are laid by the queen and reared by the new workers, which also go out to forage and enlarge the nest. Nests generally contain a single queen and grow in size over the years. No reproductives are produced until the colony is large and mature enough. In the event that a nest site is inadequate for further colony development, a new site can be found and the colony can migrate, the workers carrying the larvae and pupae.

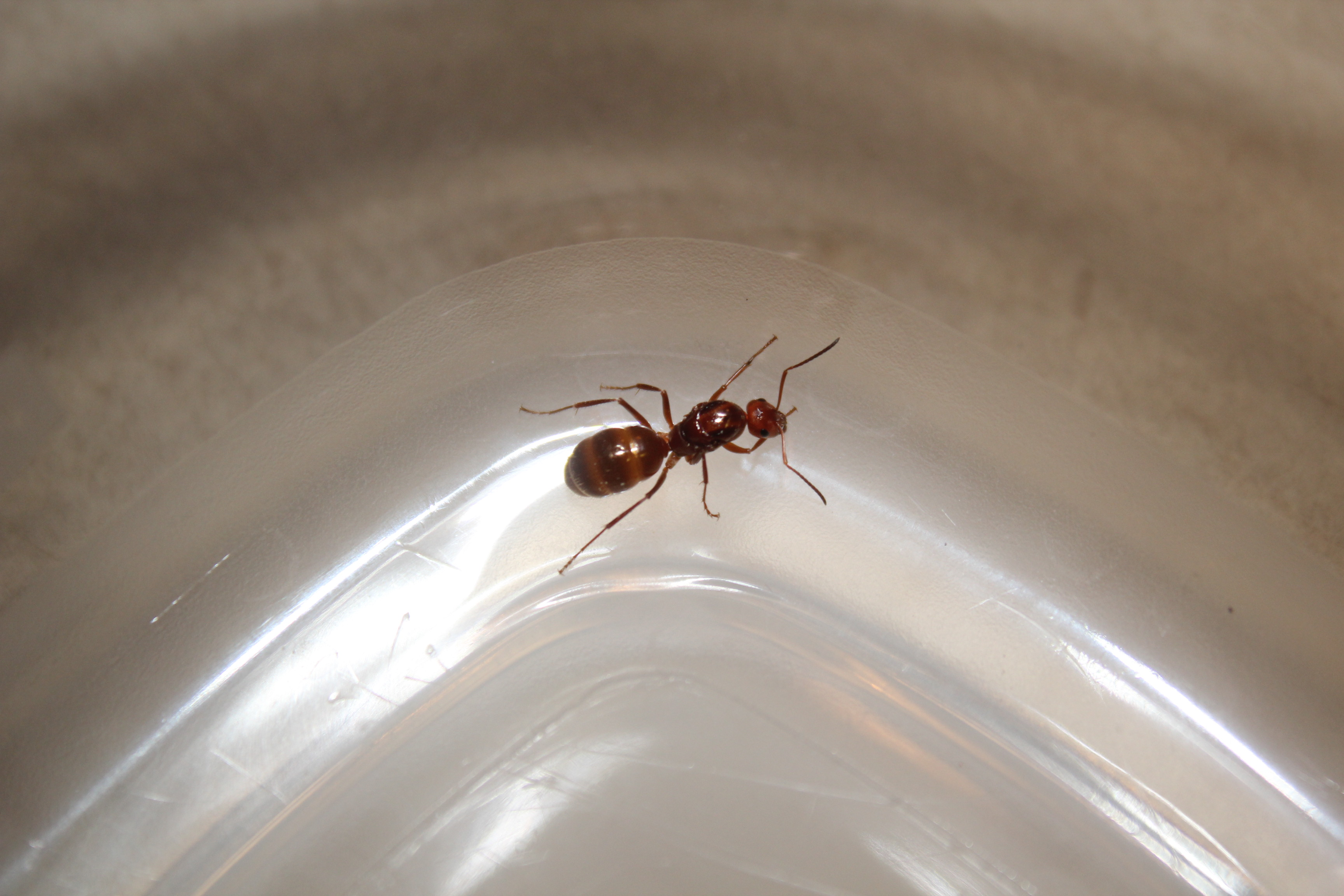
Formica pallidefulva queen

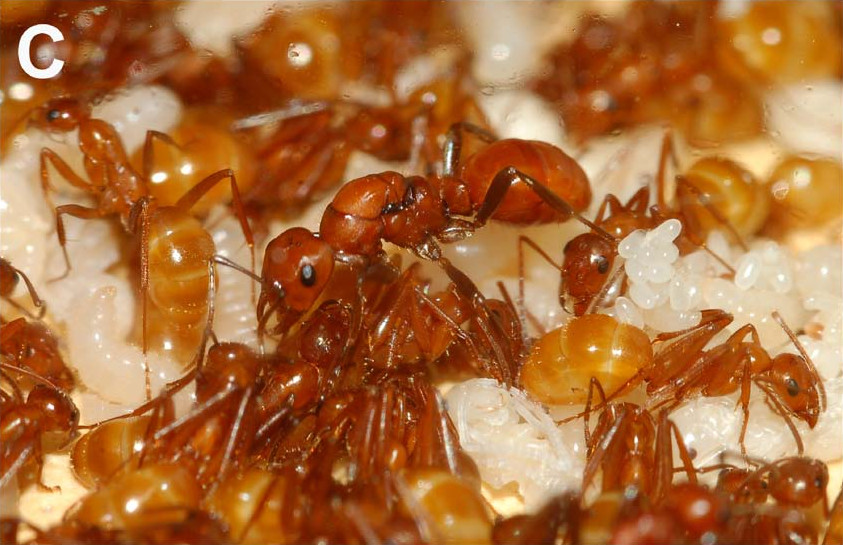
Queen, host workers, and brood of Polyergus montivagus with host F. pallidefulva

The nests of F. pallidefulva are sometimes raided by the slave-making ant Polyergus montivagus. The raiding ants are known as slavemaker or dulotic ants and the raided ones as slaves or hosts, and the pupae and larvae of the host are carried off. They are taken back to the dulotic nest and reared there by host ants already present in the nest. When they emerge from their pupae, they join the mixed colony's workforce.

== The beginning of a colony ==
=== Queen and first clutch ===
Field ant queens, the reproductive females in their colony, also are generally the largest. Their primary function is reproduction. Typically, an ant queen will seek to found a new colony following a nuptial flight. They are claustral, meaning that they will create a small hole in the ground and lay their first batch of 4-7 eggs there; not leaving throughout the whole process. The eggs will hatch into larvae roughly seven days after being laid. For the next week the queen will care for the larvae until they begin to form into pupae. Field ant larvae create cocoons for their pupae stage. The pupae will emerge from their cocoons roughly two weeks after forming them. Once emerged, these new ants will spend 3–10 days in the nest or until their exoskeletons are completely hardened.
