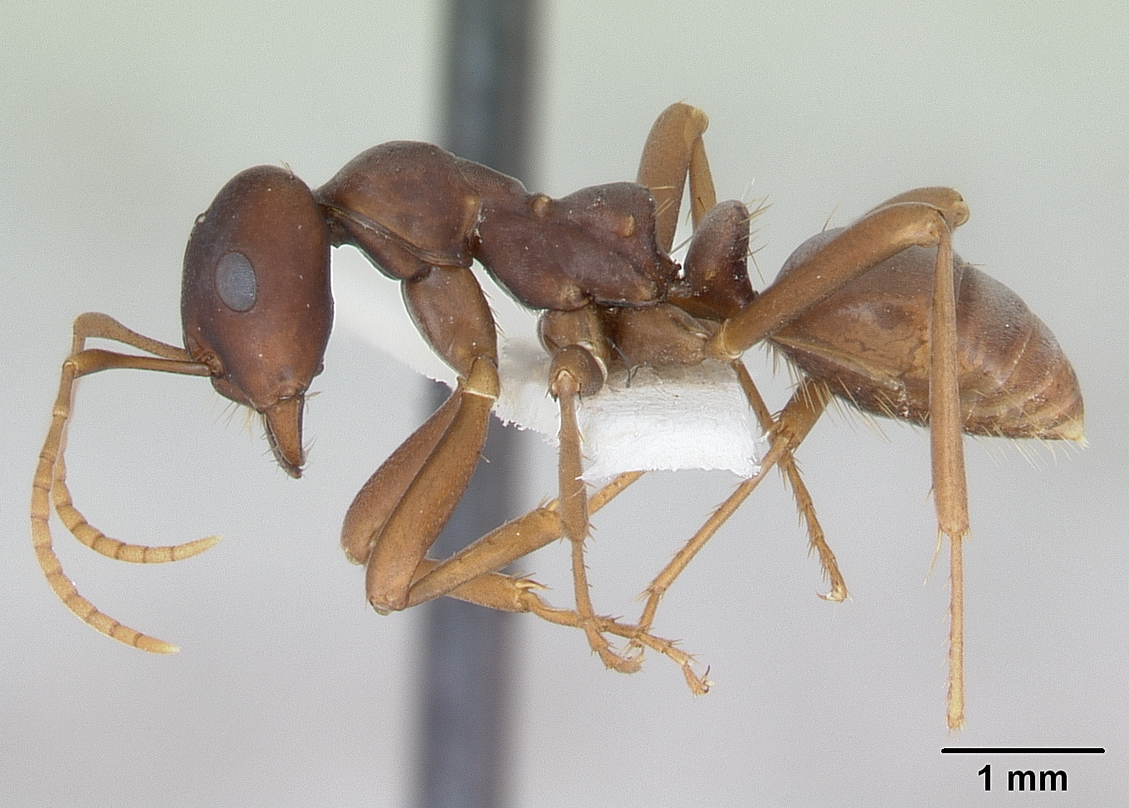

Conservation status
- Vulnerable (IUCN 2.3)

Scientific classification
- Kingdom: Animalia
- Phylum: Arthropoda
- Class: Insecta
- Order: Hymenoptera
- Family: Formicidae
- Subfamily: Formicinae
- Genus: Polyergus
- Species: P. samurai

Binomial name
- Polyergus samurai (Yano, 1911)

= Polyergus samurai =

Species of ant

Polyergus samurai is a species of slave-making ant in the subfamily Formicinae.

== Distribution ==
It was long thought endemic to Japan, but is now also known from Korea and northeastern China.

== Description ==
The queen and workers of this slave-maker ant species are black or dark brown in color (unlike the more western species) generally matching the host species in color.

== Behavior ==
Like other species of the genus, it is a parasite to host Formica ant species. The colony begins when a young queen leaves her parent colony and mates. The queen then searches for a suitable host colony. When the P. samurai queen invades the host Formica japonica colony, she kills the resident Formica queen or queens and adopts the colony's scent. She then takes the role as queen, laying eggs destined to become her first "slave"-makers. When the original Formica work force is starting to die out, the new workers of the colony begin to search for other colonies of the Formica to raid. Once a colony is located, workers will gather above the nest before leaving in a large group to the nest. Once workers reach the host Formica nest they rush in and attempt to steal as many large larvae and pupae as possible before returning to the nest with them, destined to become workers for the P. samurai colony. Such raids never kill the queen of suitable host Formica species, so the colony can be raided repeatedly over the summer.
