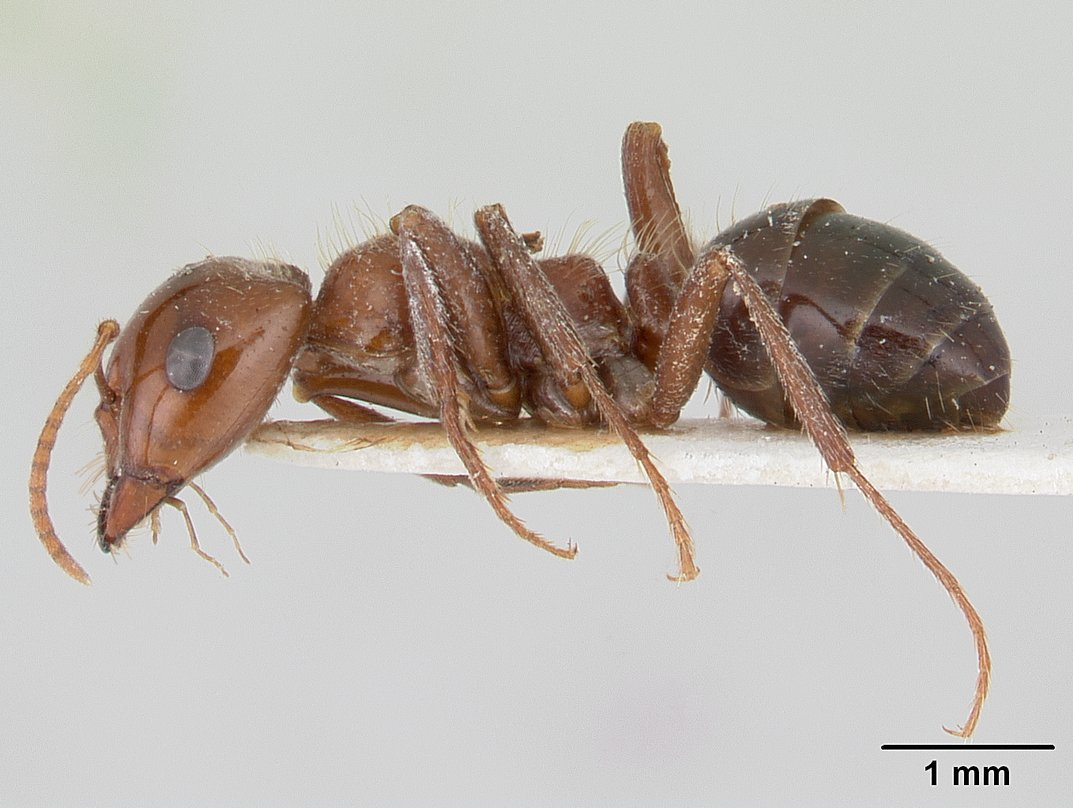
- Rossomyrmex proformicarum worker

Conservation status
- Vulnerable (IUCN 2.3)

Scientific classification
- Kingdom: Animalia
- Phylum: Arthropoda
- Clade: Pancrustacea
- Class: Insecta
- Order: Hymenoptera
- Family: Formicidae
- Subfamily: Formicinae
- Genus: Rossomyrmex
- Species: R. proformicarum

Binomial name
- Rossomyrmex proformicarum Arnol'di, 1928

= Rossomyrmex proformicarum =

Species of ant

Rossomyrmex proformicarum is a species of slave-making ant in the subfamily Formicinae. It is native to European Russia.
