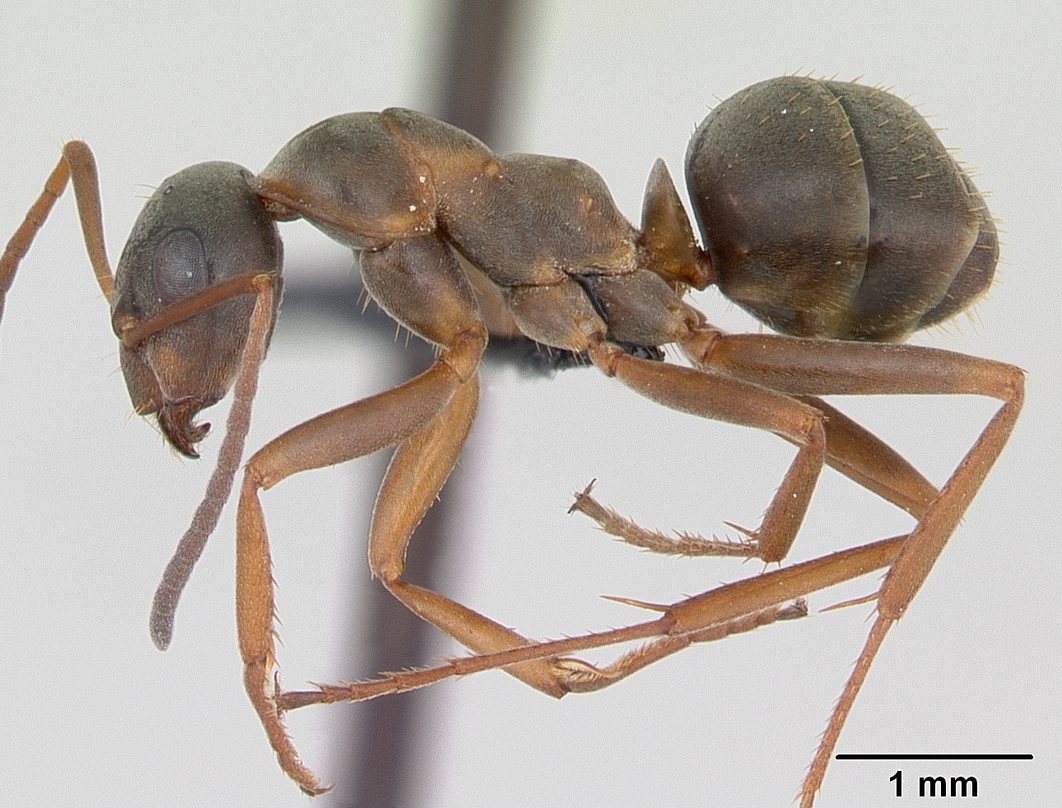
- Formica cunicularia worker

Scientific classification
- Kingdom: Animalia
- Phylum: Arthropoda
- Class: Insecta
- Order: Hymenoptera
- Family: Formicidae
- Subfamily: Formicinae
- Genus: Formica
- Species: F. cunicularia

Binomial name
- Formica cunicularia Latreille, 1798

= Formica cunicularia =

Species of ant

Formica cunicularia is a species of ant found all over Europe. They are especially common in western Europe and southern England, but they can be found from southern Scandinavia to northern Africa and from Portugal to the Urals. In England, Donisthorpe records the species as having occurred as far north as Bewdley in Worcestershire. In Formica cunicularia, the worker is an ashy grey black color and is usually 4.0–6.5 mm long. The males are found to have a uniformly dark body and are 8.0–9.0 mm long. The queen is yellowish red to dark black and is 7.5–9.0 mm.

== Habitat ==
F. cunicularia has habitat ranging from open to relatively cluttered to visually rich. In Finland, Albrecht found that all nests were small, with single entrances in dry, hot environments with low vegetation. They nest under stones or in small earth mounds. Nests are usually separate, containing one queen. F. cunicularia, unlike most other Formica fusca-group species, can form noticeable hillocks over its nests, and in addition to these produces rufibarbis-like runs in the vicinity of its nest.

== Biology ==
When found in arid and semi-arid regions, these ants feed primarily on seeds and as such, their anthills have a much higher density of seeds, but due to the seed preference of the ants there is less seed diversity. F. cunicularia will follow irregular paths while they forage, but will follow a straight path home when finished. They do this by a process called path integration where they analyze their total distance and direction on their foraging trips so that they can follow that straight path home. That isn't the only mechanism that explains their homing behavior though. They can also find a path home based on visual cues in their surroundings. An interesting facet of their homing behavior is that they will combine these two methods when in unfamiliar terrain. F. cunicularia have the ability to discern between multiple shades of a color and they are particularly good at distinguishing two different greens; This is probably because they often live in very green rich environments. They live in small colonies of around 5000 individuals. They are predaceous but are often scavengers. Its appearance and habits ally it, to some extent, with Formica rufibarbis, although the former's red markings are far less conspicuous. Horace Donisthorpe comments:

Forel points out that [Formica fusca var.] rubescens [=F. cunicularia] has frequently been confounded with rufibarbis, and it is probable that some British records of ... rufibarbis really refer to this variety.

== Lichen dispersal ==
An interesting coincidence of these ants is that they help lichen disperse. Lichen has trouble on its own and the soredia of the lichen can attach to the ants by virtue of being so small. In areas where they overlap we see more of certain types of lichen growing due to the F. cunicularia's help. There doesn't seem to be any benefit to the ants.

== As a slave species ==
F. cunicularia is a host of the slave-making ant Polyergus rufescens. Slave makers P. rufescens will raid to kill adults in the F. cunicularia colony and steal their brood to be raised to do domestic tasks. P. rufescens will choose to parasitize F. cunicularia over other choices even when available. A gland not unique to F. cunicularia is the Dufour's gland. It is involved with many behaviors of ants, such as trail following, clustering, but also alarm and defense. When F. cunicularia daubed with extract from a slave-maker ant's Dufour's gland, there was a significant decrease in aggression towards invading workers. This facilitates the takeover of the hosts colony. Another possible reason for F. cunicularia being chosen as a host species more often because they don't resist as much as other species. In an experiment involving cocoons of multiple species, they didn't discriminate between their own and the slave-making species.
