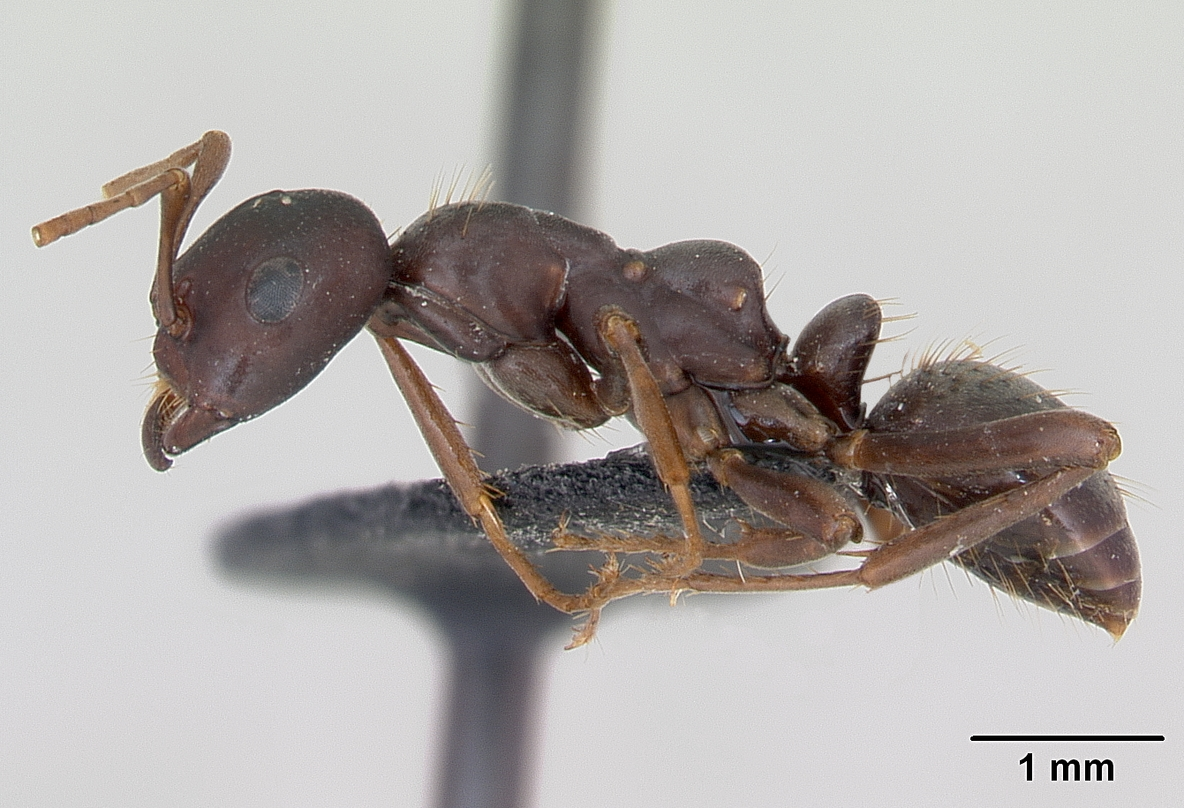
- Polyergus nigerrimus worker

Conservation status
- Vulnerable (IUCN 2.3)

Scientific classification
- Kingdom: Animalia
- Phylum: Arthropoda
- Class: Insecta
- Order: Hymenoptera
- Family: Formicidae
- Subfamily: Formicinae
- Genus: Polyergus
- Species: P. nigerrimus

Binomial name
- Polyergus nigerrimus Marikovsky, 1963

= Polyergus nigerrimus =

Species of ant

Polyergus nigerrimus is a species of slave-making ant in the subfamily Formicinae. It is native to Russia.
