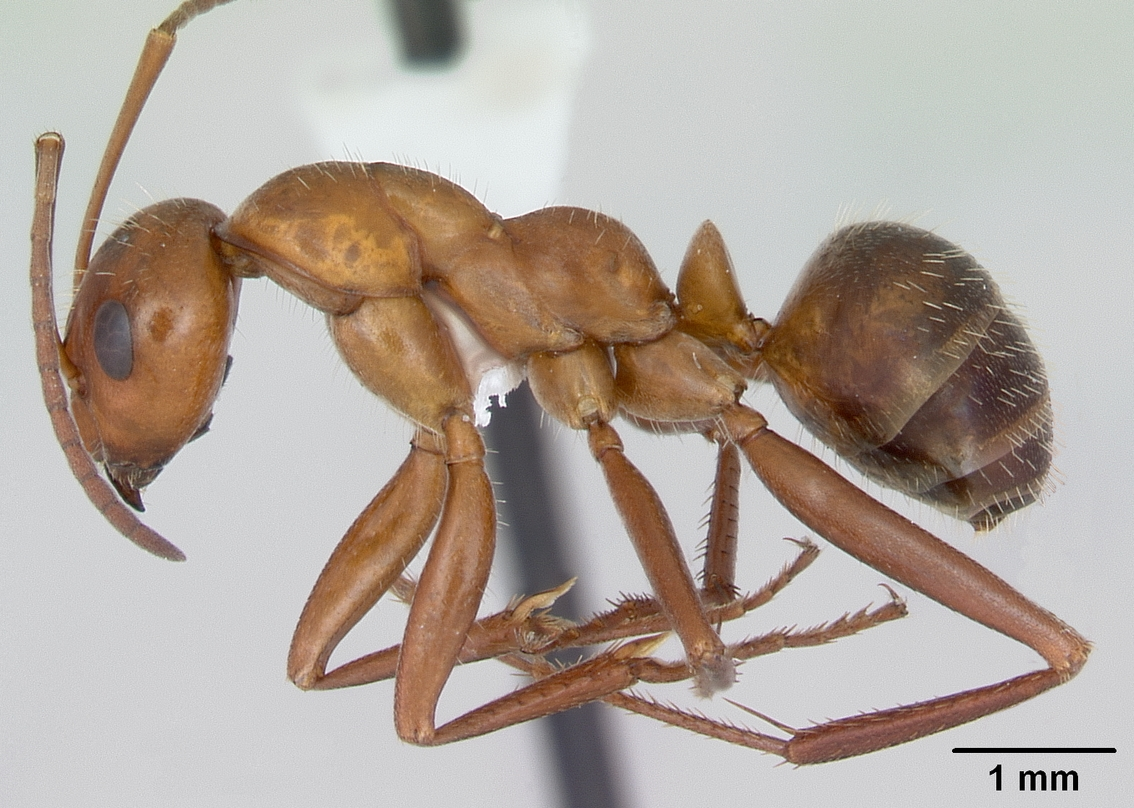
- Formica incerta worker

Scientific classification
- Kingdom: Animalia
- Phylum: Arthropoda
- Clade: Pancrustacea
- Class: Insecta
- Order: Hymenoptera
- Family: Formicidae
- Subfamily: Formicinae
- Genus: Formica
- Species: F. incerta

Binomial name
- Formica incerta Emery, 1893

= Formica incerta =

Species of ant

Formica incerta is a species of ant found in eastern North America. It is the most common species of Formica in many areas, and excavates underground nests with small entrance holes. Its diet includes nectar produced by extrafloral nectaries and honeydew, which it obtains from aphids and treehoppers. It is the main host for the slave-making ant Polyergus lucidus. F. incerta was first described by Italian entomologist Carlo Emery in 1893. Its specific name comes from the Latin incertus meaning "uncertain" and seems particularly apt given the subsequent uncertainty as to the validity of the species and the difficulty in distinguishing this ant from other species living in the same area.

== Description ==
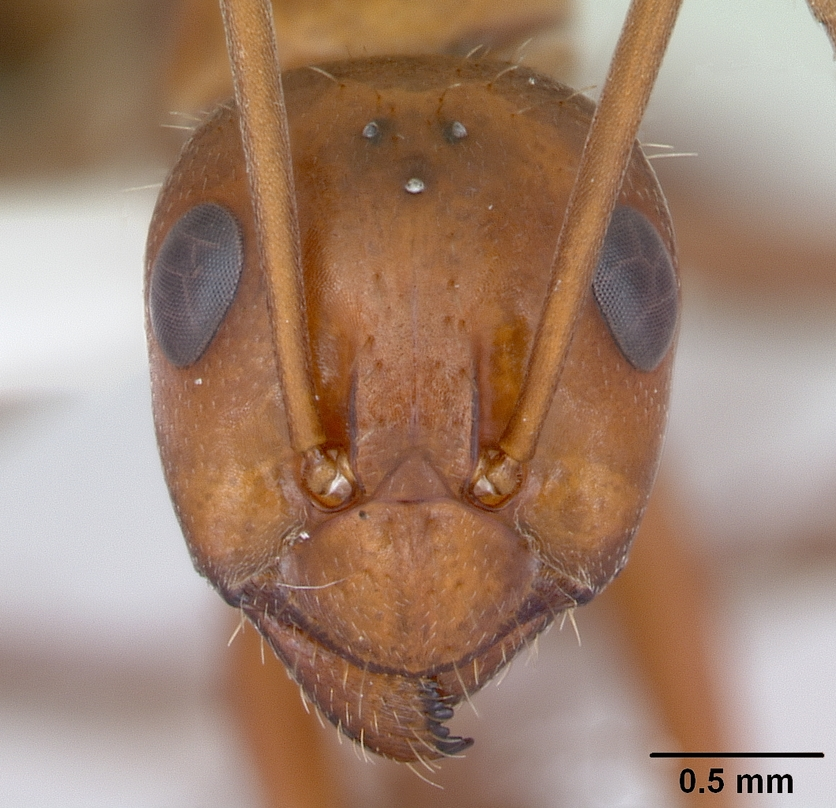
Head of worker showing antennae, mandibles, 2 compound eyes and 3 simple eyes

A worker of F. incerta is very similar in appearance to Formica pallidefulva, but the former has a few chaetae on the mesosoma and around the petiole, while the latter does not. F. incerta is a slightly paler colour and less glossy than F. pallidefulva but considerable variability exists between specimens and between colonies. The queen is larger than the workers and can be distinguished from a queen of other species by three dark spots on her thorax.

== Distribution and habitat ==
Formica incerta is native to the eastern half of the United States. Its range extends from Minnesota, Nebraska, New England, and the Appalachian balds southwards to Colorado and possibly New Mexico. It is present in sandy and clayey soils and favors old grassland, meadows, and heathland, but is also found in sparse woodlands, forest rides, prairies, parks, lawns, and roadside verges. In many areas, it is the most abundant species of Formica ant and the first to recolonize restored grassland.

== Behaviour ==
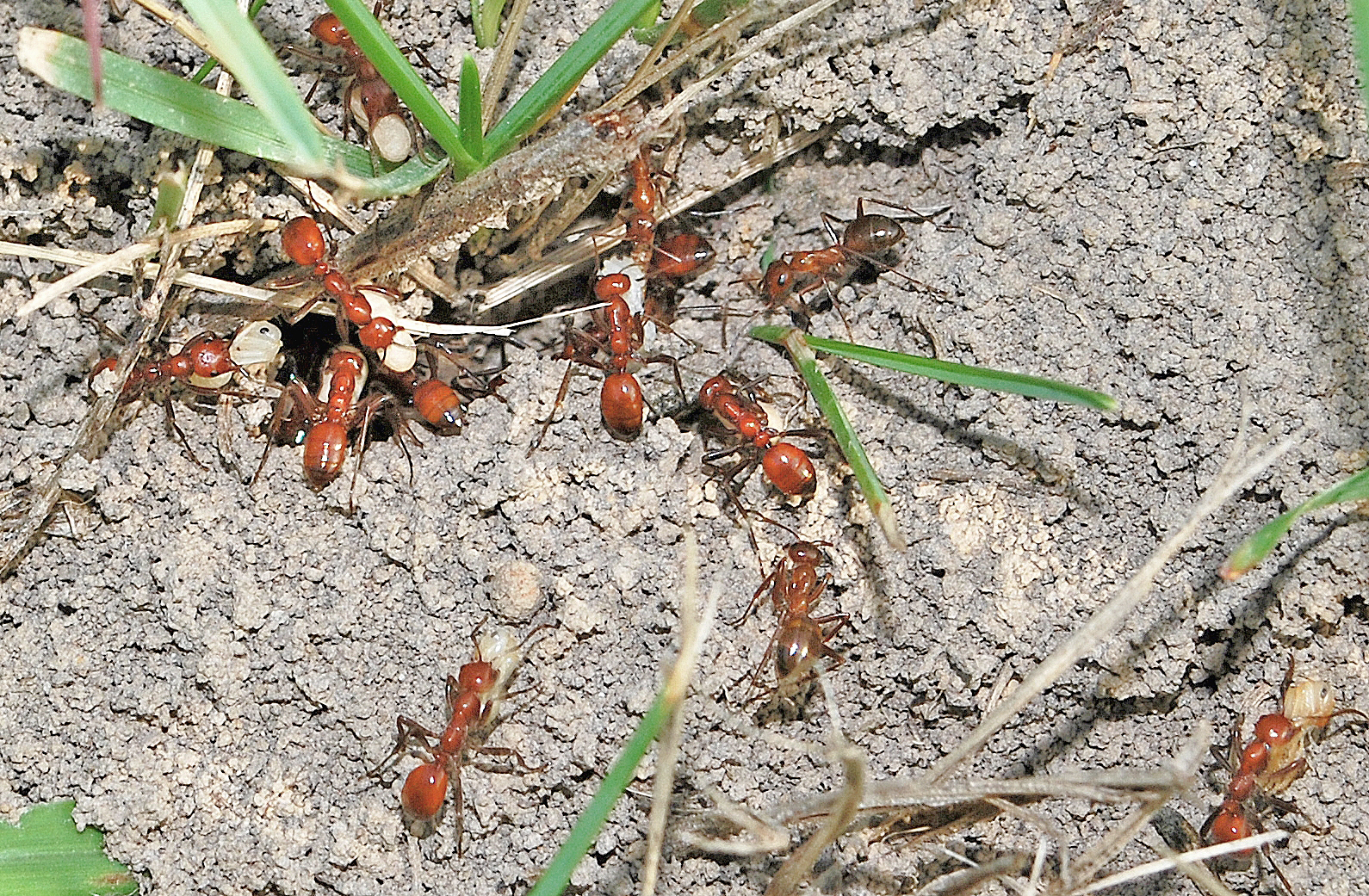
Polyergus lucidus workers raiding an F. incerta nest

The nest of F. incerta is excavated below ground and consists of one or more large chambers near the surface from which descend one or several vertical galleries about 1 cm (0.4 in) in diameter and up to 110 cm (43 in) long. The chambers in which the ants live radiate off these and typically measure 4 by 2.5 cm (2 by 1 in), each having a level floor and domed roof. No mound is seen on the surface above the nest, but a newly excavated entrance may be surrounded by a halo of ejected soil. The entrance is inconspicuous and up to 2.5 cm (1 in) in diameter. Occasionally, two entrances to the nest are seen.

A nest harbors several thousand ants and the eggs, larvae, and pupae. The largest colonies excavated in a Michigan study had several queens, a small number of winged females and developing reproductives, a few dozen immature workers, 2,000 mature workers, 2,000 pupae, 1,500 larvae, and a similar number of eggs. Some of the late-season larvae overwinter and augment the early-season workforce in the following year. The worker ants emerge from the nest to forage during the day. Newly mated queens likely join an existing colony of the same species and new colonies are founded when workers dig a new nest near the original one, carry some of the brood across, and guide a queen to the new nest.

Formica incerta has a varied diet, and workers forage for nectar produced by extrafloral nectaries on such plants as sunflowers and partridge peas. They also gather the honeydew from aphids and treehoppers and defend these food sources from non-nestmates, from ants of other species, and from parasitoids. In regions where larger ant species are numerous, they may be more furtive in their food-gathering behavior. On bare pastures, they are heavily preyed upon by northern flickers (Colaptes auratus). They are also the main target species for raids by the slave-making ant Polyergus lucidus, which steals the pupae and late-stage larvae.
