= Social conflict in ants =

In ants, social conflicts, sex conflicts, or caste conflicts can exist. These conflicts occur within the same colony or supercolony at various levels: on an individual scale, between two or more specific ants; on the scale of sex, between males and females; or on the scale of different castes, between queens and workers. They should not be confused with ant wars, which involve different and opposing colonies or supercolonies. Even as larvae, ants can engage in conflicts, typically at the scale of the entire colony, against other individuals within the same colony. These social conflicts may involve the male-to-female ratio within the colony. For example, in some species, male and female larvae may engage in mutual cannibalism, often with males being more aggressive, to increase their chances of survival and growth. Conflicts can also arise between workers and queens over the management of the larvae produced; workers may favor female larvae, while queens increase the ratio of males they lay. These conflicts are generally more intense depending on the degree of relatedness between the ants involved. For instance, ants belonging to the same supercolony or a polygynous colony - meaning a colony with several queens - tend to engage more against workers or larvae from a queen different from their own. In species and colonies operating under the gamergate system, where each worker is a potential queen, ants engage in battles to become the sole or one of the few worker-queens capable of laying eggs.

The study of such conflicts tends to show that ants can act to favor their individual interests, and not just the colony or queen's interests. It also tends to shed light on the fact that, in some cases, ant colonies can be highly structured with hierarchies and power relationships between the various ants.

== Terminology ==
The use of the term "social conflicts" or "caste conflicts" is documented in the scientific literature.

== Background ==
Ant societies, being highly structured based on the sex of the individuals and their caste (males, workers, queens), generally see conflicts organized and developed around these aspects. While these conflicts often occur on an individual level, they are frequently shared by many members of the colonies, leading to broader dynamics. Thus, conflicts regularly revolve around determining the male-to-female ratio within the colonies. If those oppositions seem to involve genetical factors in a lot of occurrences, it doesn't seem to be always the case. This is also possible since ant colonies, in some cases, seem to be highly structured with hierarchies and power relationships between the different individuals.

== Processes ==
=== Larva and worker-queen conflicts ===
In ants, conflicts exist even at the larval stage. In certain ant species, male and female larvae tend to cannibalize other larvae. This behavior increases their own chances of survival and is generally more prevalent among male larvae, who try to enhance their growth and survival prospects. This behavior is more common toward larvae originating from a different queen within the same colony or supercolony. Conflicts over larval management can also extend to adult ants. Queens may tend to aim for a male-to-female ratio of 0.5 when laying eggs, while workers seek to adjust this ratio toward a higher proportion of worker ants, which are more beneficial for the pragmatic management of the colony. This creates a constant power struggle between the queens and the workers over larval management. Typically, the queen responds to this conflict by laying a higher ratio of male eggs, while the workers either neglect or, to a lesser extent, cannibalize the male larvae, focusing more on caring for worker larvae. In studies conducted on colonies exhibiting such behaviors, workers seem to prevail in most cases, although this is not always the rule.

In some ant species, including in the genus Formica, larvae may attempt to become queens by gaining access to more significant nutritional resources, which explains why such individual conflicts can occur among larvae. These larvae engage in various strategies to increase their nutritional intake, including begging for food or cannibalizing other larvae. The queen or queens of the colony can also engage in pheromonal strategies to try to control the nutritional activities carried out by the workers and influence their choices regarding how to feed the larvae.

=== Individuality and hierarchies ===
In general, the issue of conflicts within ant communities challenges the notion that they lack individuality. Indeed, numerous conflicts, which can even escalate to violence and death, demonstrate a form of individuality among ants. This is clearly shown as ants seem to often follow their own respective interests in the advent of such oppositions or conflicts. They tend to show selfishness behavior in those cases. In some cases, such as in Temnothorax unifasciatus, where workers can lay eggs alongside the queen, it seems that ants policing other ants would be a selfish behavior taken by the workers to increase their own chances of becoming egg-laying workers afterwards. It tends to shed light on the hierarchical structures that can exist in ant colonies, where ants organize themselves into various ranks and exhibit complex power relationships.

=== Gamergates ===
In ant colonies using the gamergate system, where all workers have a spermatheca and thus the potential to become egg-laying individuals, conflicts are much more violent and are a regular part of colony management. Workers may engage in contests and confrontations to determine who will have the right or possibility to lay eggs. In these colonies, such disputes are common and are crucial for the survival of the community.
