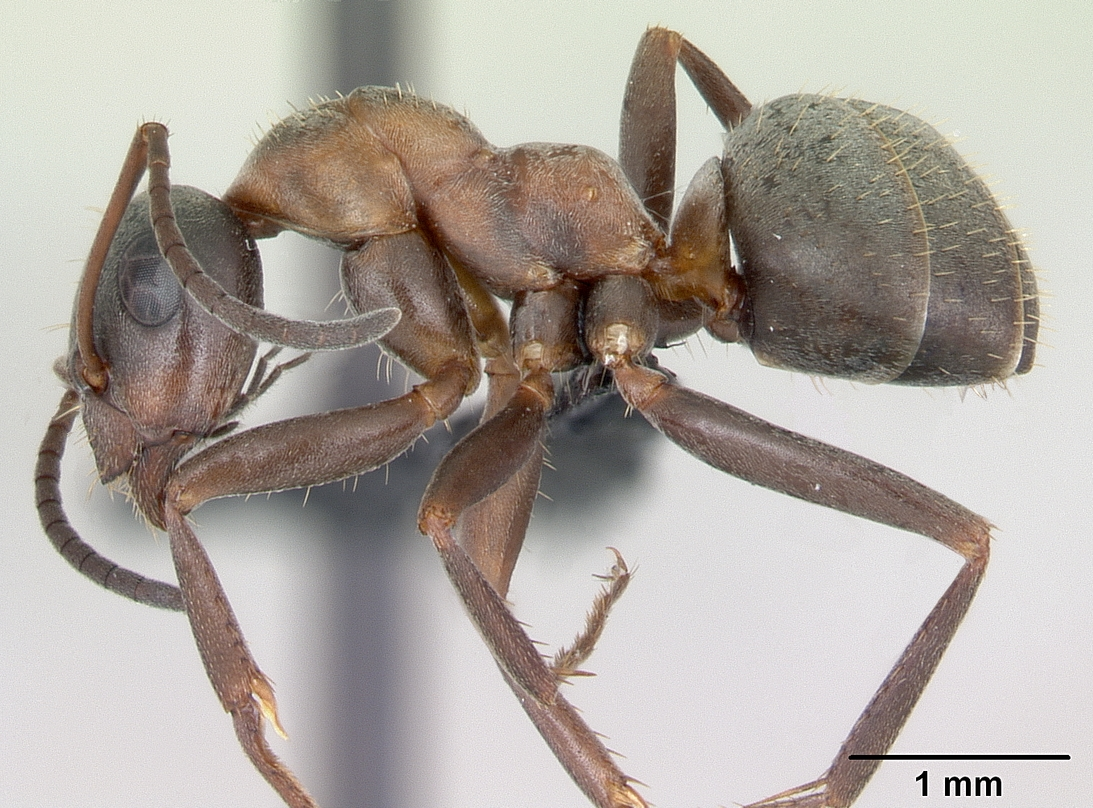
- Formica rufibarbis worker

Scientific classification
- Domain: Eukaryota
- Kingdom: Animalia
- Phylum: Arthropoda
- Class: Insecta
- Order: Hymenoptera
- Family: Formicidae
- Subfamily: Formicinae
- Genus: Formica
- Species: F. rufibarbis

Binomial name
- Formica rufibarbis Fabricius, 1793

= Formica rufibarbis =

Species of ant

Formica rufibarbis is a European formicine ant of the Formica fusca group. In the classification by Auguste Forel, it is treated in the subgenus Serviformica. F. rufibarbis is subject to a Species Action Plan (SAP) in England, where it is known from only two locations, although it is not considered to be at risk on continental Europe.

== Taxonomy ==
The name Formica rufibarbis was first given to this ant by Lord Avebury in Britain in his 1881 work Ants, Bees and Wasps although the species had been earlier misidentified as F. cunicularia by Frederick Smith in 1851.

== Description ==
The Red-barbed Ant is readily identified by its relatively large size and distinctive coloration of a blackish head and thorax, contrasting with a light reddish thorax. Small dark workers do occur and may be mistaken for F. fusca, although there is always a degree of colouration between thorax and abdomen. Workers can also be confused with F. cunicularia which does not have hairs on the thorax.

== Life cycle ==
Colonies usually contain one to three queens, although the occurrence of gynaecoid or egg laying workers has also been recorded. Queens found colonies in the same manner as other ants from the Formica fusca group. Eggs are first laid early in the new year, and colonies reach a maximum size of around 500 workers. Alates emerge in late June to early July.

== Distribution and habitat ==
It is locally common throughout continental Europe, and ranges from Portugal to Western Siberia. it nests in short, lowland grass and heather or maritime heath overlying loose or sandy soils.

=== Status in Britain ===
In Britain, the species has always been scarce, confined to heaths in Surrey and the Isles of Scilly, where it is sometimes known as the "St Martin's Ant". In the 1927 edition of British Ants: their life histories and classification, Donisthorpe gives its distribution as being confined to Ripley, Chobham, Reigate and Weybridge. In 2004 there were only four nests in Surrey. It was once found in Cornwall at Whitsand Bay but has not been recorded since 1907. In the Isles of Scilly it is found on the islands of Great Ganilly, Nornour, St Martin's and Teän. As of 2015, F. rufibarbis is now confined to one known colony on mainland Britain, nesting on the edge of a Heath, the location is kept a closely guarded secret due to the risk posed by curious members of the public. However the nest is also at risk from F. sanguinea, a slavemaker ant, which currently nests only a few hundred meters away.

== Behaviour ==
F. rufibarbis nests completely within the ground, usually in sandy banks, and nest chambers situated about a foot beneath the surface are accessible only from a single entrance. This makes the locating of colonies very difficult, so it is possible that the small numbers of recorded colonies constitute an under-representation. Workers forage singly and Donisthorpe observed: "The workers are very audacious and will even endeavour to rob F. rufa of its prey – holding on and pulling – and the moment the rufa lets go, to get a better grip, or to attack the rufibarbis, the latter swiftly decamps with the prize." Workers also possess a remarkable sense of sight, and will proceed to their nest entrance in a dead straight line even if major obstacles are placed to disrupt their path. Donisthorpe describes this phenomenon thus: "On July 12, 1913, having observed several rufibarbis workers running about on a path near a sandy bank at Weybridge, I endeavoured to find their nest, and commenced to pull up handfuls of herbage on the top of the bank, which I let fall on the slope. I then saw a worker approaching with a fly in its jaws and start to mount the bank, and as the scattered herbage was directly in its way, I feared the ant might be diverted from its nest, but when it reached the obstacle it never hesitated for a moment, but running straight over it in a direct line, entered its nest on the top of the bank, which I was thus enabled to find."

== Predation ==
Like other Serviformica, this species is subject to raids by dulotic species such as Formica sanguinea and Polyergus rufescens where their ranges coalesce. In Britain this only takes place at Chobham in the case of the former (the latter does not occur in the country).

== See also ==
- List of ants of Great Britain
