= War in ants =

Conflict between groups of ants

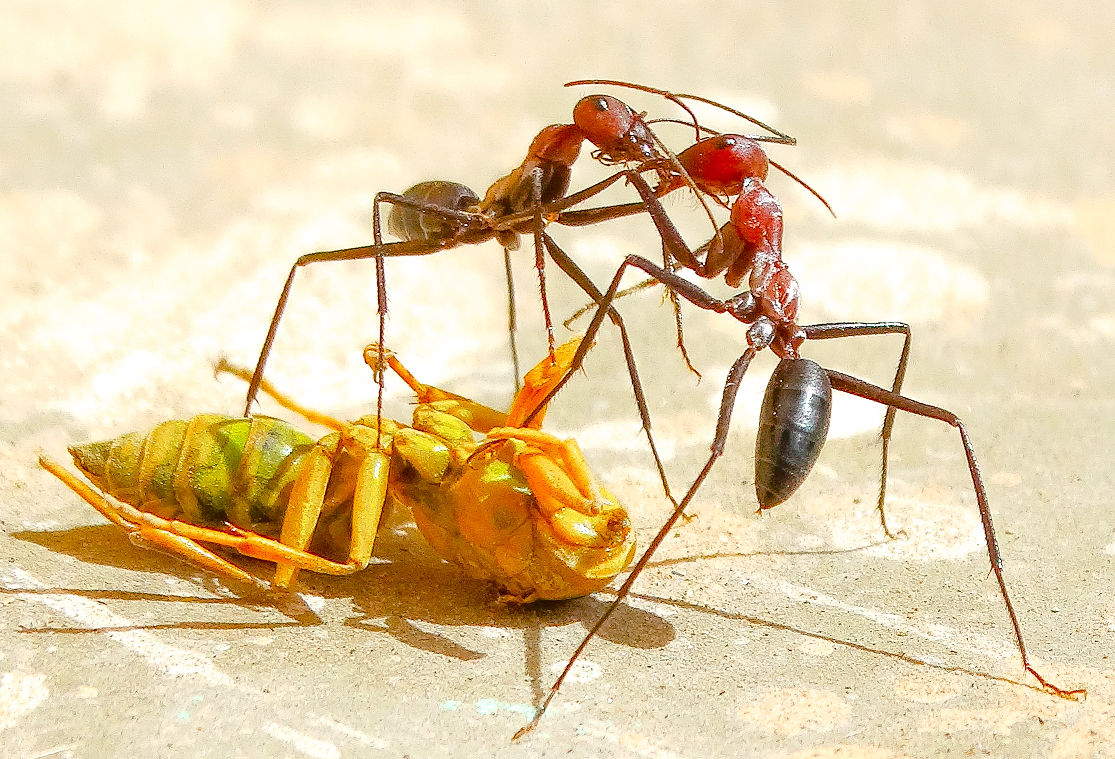
Two ants (Cataglyphis sp.) fighting over a dead wasp.

Wars or conflicts can break out between different groups in some ant species for a variety of reasons. These violent confrontations typically involve entire colonies, sometimes allied with each other, and can end in a stalemate, the complete destruction of one of the belligerents, the migration of one of the groups, or, in some cases, the establishment of cordial relations between the different combatants or the adoption of members of the losing group. For some species of ants, this is even a deliberately undertaken strategy, as they require capturing pupae from other species to ensure the continuity of their colony. Thus, there are specific biological evolutions in certain species intended to give them an advantage in such conflicts. In some of these confrontations, ants can adopt ritualized behavior, even governed by certain implicit rules, for example by organizing duels between the most important ants of each colony or choosing a specific location for a battle.

They should not be confused with social conflicts inside the same colony or supercolony of ants.

These conflicts are not simply internal to ants, which can fight each other even within the same species, but also involve other animals, particularly other eusocial insects like termites or wasps. In the early 21st century, with the rapid spread of many species into new habitats, significant wars are being waged between different supercolonies.

== Terminology ==
The use of the term "war", found in scientific literature, is an anthropocentric analogy, derived from human wars.

== Causes and prevalence ==
=== Causes ===
The reasons that can lead ant colonies to clash are varied and depend on the species, locations, and contexts. For a number of them, such as leafcutter ants Atta laevigata, wood ants of the genus Formica, certain species of the genus Carebara, or giant ants Dinomyrmex gigas, it is a matter of territory covered and thus the available food for the different colonies. It can also be related to issues of overpopulation of the same species in the same area at certain times of the year. In other cases, some species aim to capture the pupae of an opposing group to use them in their own colony later.

=== Prevalence ===
It is difficult to assess the prevalence of this type of behavior in ants, given the significant diversity of species, behaviors, and different situations. Some species undergo specific evolutions with the sole purpose of engaging in these conflicts, such as Polyergus rufescens, which have sickle-shaped mandibles. The emergence of supercolonies from the 19th century, facilitated by human movements, has certainly reinforced these behaviors in the affected ants. It also seems to depend on the context in which the ants find themselves. For instance, within the same species, a colony facing external threats from another ant colony can produce up to twice as many soldiers larvae as a colony not experiencing the same pressures. Some species are almost exclusively on defensive strategies, such as Camponotus ligniperdus, which are peaceful and occupy a small territory but defend it fiercely against any incursion, even against more dangerous or deadly species.

== Process and outcomes ==
=== Process ===
In general, there are two main ways ants conduct these conflicts. On the one hand, some species use specific ants that are more powerful and whose primary function is to fight. On the other hand, colonies increase the number of available fighters and send large numbers of individuals into battle. In some species, conflict is ritualized, for example through limited duels undertaken by the individuals most capable of combat, but phenomena of battles are also common. In the genus Formica, such battles are commonplace and can involve tens of thousands of individuals, and they are sometimes ritualized, with the respective groups withdrawing at nightfall only to return the next day to the same locations to resume the battle. The bodies of dead or injured ants are then brought back to the colony, where they are eaten. In other species, such as within the genus Carebara, ants arrange themselves in specific formations before the battle, like phalanxes, and advance against each other. They also regularly sacrifice workers, whose role is to try to hinder, injure, and attack enemy majors, before their own majors join the battlefield and can intervene.

In other cases, particularly among ants that aim to capture larvae or pupae, colonies use chemical weapons, such as olfactory propaganda, to try to enter the targeted colonies as discreetly as possible.

=== Outcomes ===
Generally, wars between ants are costly for the groups, which must allocate a significant portion of their production to the war effort, to the detriment of forming workers, for example. These wars can result in the death of tens of thousands of individuals within a few hours; for wood ants of the genus Formica, there are regularly 10,000 casualties per day during the spring. For these ants, the war ends either when the opposing colony is destroyed or when the available prey is sufficient again for the needs of the colonies, which have then lost thousands of members. Estimates from 2016 on certain ant species show a loss of about a third of the total colony population in case of victory.

For some species, such as Crematogaster mimosae, victory over an opposing colony usually results in the flight or death of the opposing queen, but the victorious colony often adopts the surviving ants of the losing colony, likely a way to avoid and mitigate the significant resource loss due to the war effort. In a few rare cases, the queen of the losing colony is herself adopted by the victorious colony, and the two merge.

== Supercolonies ==
With the development of ant supercolonies, which follows human expansion into new areas, groups of dozens, hundreds, or even thousands of colonies engage in large-scale conflicts against other species. For example, around San Diego, United States, in the 2010s, millions of ants died each month in significant battles between the supercolony formed by Argentine ants and three other supercolonies present in the area.
