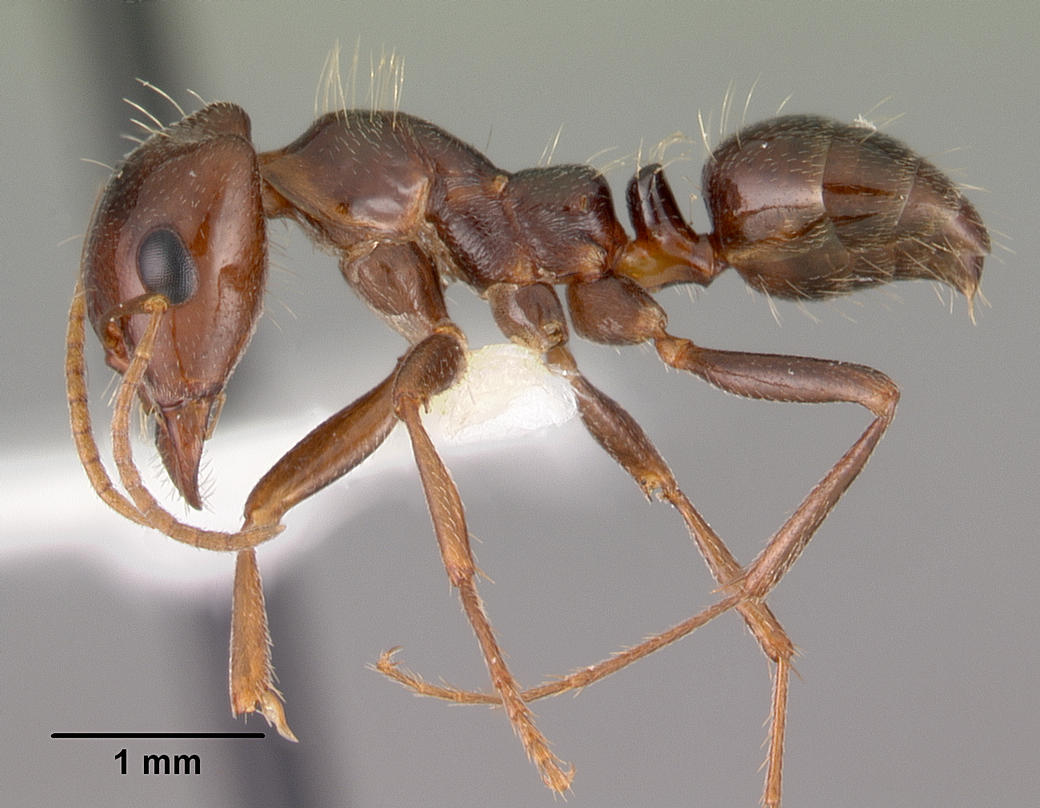
- Rossomyrmex minuchae worker

Conservation status
- Vulnerable (IUCN 2.3)

Scientific classification
- Kingdom: Animalia
- Phylum: Arthropoda
- Clade: Pancrustacea
- Class: Insecta
- Order: Hymenoptera
- Family: Formicidae
- Subfamily: Formicinae
- Genus: Rossomyrmex
- Species: R. minuchae

Binomial name
- Rossomyrmex minuchae Tinaut, 1981

Synonyms
- Rossomrymex minuchae Tinaut, 1981 [orth. error]

= Rossomyrmex minuchae =

Species of ant

Rossomyrmex minuchae is a species of slave-making ant in the subfamily Formicinae. It is native to Spain.
