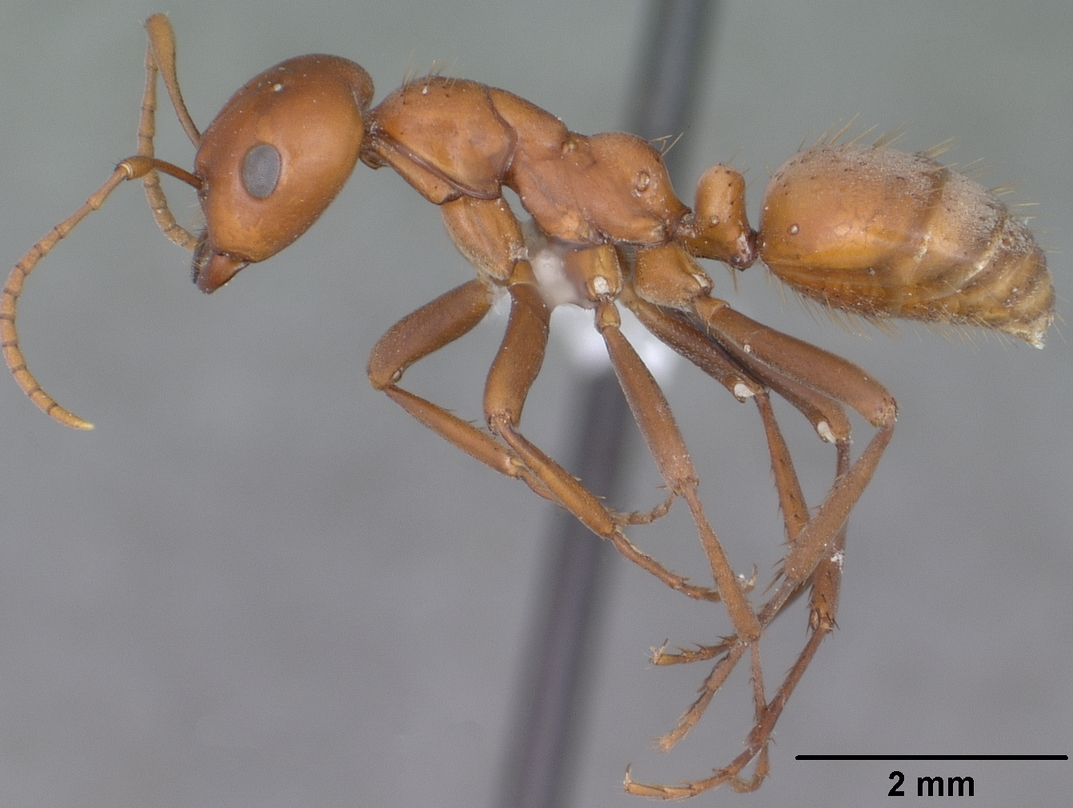

Conservation status
- Vulnerable (IUCN 2.3)

Scientific classification
- Kingdom: Animalia
- Phylum: Arthropoda
- Class: Insecta
- Order: Hymenoptera
- Family: Formicidae
- Subfamily: Formicinae
- Genus: Polyergus
- Species: P. breviceps

Binomial name
- Polyergus breviceps (Emery, 1893)

= Polyergus breviceps =

Species of ant

Polyergus breviceps is a species of ant endemic to the United States. It is a social parasite of other ants, namely of Formica gnava but also of Formica occulta and Formica argentea. Polyergus is an inquiline parasite, having lost its ability to take care of its young and themselves. "The workers do not forage for food, feed the young or the queen, or even clean up their own nest". To survive, Polyergus workers raid Formica nests to steal the pupae—which, once hatched, become workers of the mixed nest. This sort of relationship is not unique, of the approximately 8,800 species of ants, at least 200 have evolved some form of symbiotic relationship with one another. What makes Polyergus special is the way a newly mated queen can, all by herself, take over a Formica nest and start a new colony.

== Slave raids and colony takeovers ==
Polyergus workers emerge from their nest (a mixed nest where Formica workers are already enslaved) and forage for a suitable raid target. If they find one, the scouts return to the nest, rally the other Polyergus, and head out in a raiding column. If the new target is a Formica nest, the Polyergus incite a "panic-flee" response from the Formica by releasing formic acid and take the Formica pupae back to their nest as slaves. Occasionally, a new queen goes on a raiding column with the other Polyergus. She then, after mating, leaves the column and forages for a suitable Formica nest. Howard Topoff evaluated how the queen takes over a colony. After finding a Formica nest, she finds an entrance and is immediately attacked by Formica workers. The queen responds by biting with her sharp mandibles and releasing a pheromone from her enlarged Dufour's gland that, unlike many other parasitic ants, has a pacifying effect. The queen quickly searches for and locates the Formica queen and, with her adapted mandibles, proceeds to bite and lick various parts of the Formica queen for an average of 25 minutes. "Within seconds of the host queen's death, the nest undergoes a most remarkable transformation". The Formica workers cease to be aggressive to the intruder and start to groom the Polyergus queen as if it were their own. The takeover now complete, the Polyergus queen gains not only a nest, but a worker caste as well. She then lays her eggs and the cycle continues.

=== Mechanisms ===
Nearly all slave-making ants, including Polyergus, have mandibular adaptations that help them attack others.

Specific to Polyergus, when the queen first enters a Formica nest she releases a pheromone from her enlarged Dufour's gland. Topoff did experiments to show that this pheromone has an important facilitative effect in colony usurpation; it reduces the aggression of the defending Formica workers. The researchers took the Dufour's, pygidial, and poison glands from freshly mated Polyergus queens, using water as a negative control. These were crushed in distilled water to make a solution containing their extracts. Because it was impossible to prevent a Polyergus queen from secreting her own pheromones during a live encounter, they used the harvester ant Pogonomyrmex occidentalis (naturally attacked by Formica) as the subject. These ants were dipped in the above solutions, one ant/solution/test at a time, and placed in a petri dish with three Formica occulta "attackers". They were observed for three minutes to see for how long the Pogonomyrmex was attacked. The results were as follows: "the mean duration of aggression by the Dufour's gland treatment was 53.3 seconds...The mean duration of aggression for the water, pygidial gland, and poison gland controls were: 143.5 seconds, and 137.2 seconds and 132.2 seconds respectively". Apparently, at some time, Polyergus queens evolved the capacity to passively facilitate colony takeovers.

Topoff and Ellen Zimmerli also did experiments to prove that the Polyergus queen "tricks" the Formica colony by obtaining chemicals from the Formica queen in the process of killing her. In one test, the Formica queen was killed (by flash freezing then thawing) prior to Polyergus contact. Even though it was already dead, the Polyergus queen bit, stabbed, and licked the queen just as if it were alive: and the Polyergus was consequently accepted by the colony. Another test showed that if no Formica queen was present, then Polyergus had little chance of a successful takeover. Clearly, the Formica queen is providing some sort of chemical(s) to the Polyergus queen, however unintentionally. That takeover can occur even if the host queen is dead, but not if she is not present, proves that chemical absorption is important. The Polyergus queen needs only kill one host queen to be accepted. If the colony was polygynistic, the Polyergus queen can take her time finding the other queens. "Hour by hour, day by day, she methodically locates and kills every Formica queen, sometimes taking several weeks to clear out all remnants of opposition".

== Evolution ==
Considerable work has been published on the evolution of ant dulosis and almost all of it has at least some empirical evidence to defend its positions. Notably, that nearly all raiding ant species have is an adaptation of their mandibles that make them big or piercing or both. It makes sense that the very thing that helps an ant be a better raider makes that same ant depend on others. The parasite loses the use of its mandibles for actual work. On this and other evidence, some propose that predation is the precursor to slavery. It has also been suggested that colony multiplication by adoption and budding followed by temporary parasitism can lead to dulosis. While observations indicate that colony multiplication can lead to temporary parasitism, it is apparently very questionable that temporary parasitism leads to dulosis.

In addition, about 100 years ago, Carlo Emery observed that, "The slave-making temporarily and permanently parasitic ants originate from closely related forms which serve them as host." Jurgen Heinze did a series of experiments that prove this observation, known today as Emery's Rule. Rather than just relying solely on morphological cues, he used enzyme gel electrophoresis assays to create a detailed phylogenetic picture of host and parasite connections. His experimental results support a loose version of Emery's rule. On one end of the spectrum, they saw near identical electromorphs between species in most host and parasite pairs studied. However, it also appears that at least one example does not support Emery's rule in that (Leptothorax paraxenus) differed from its host in several electromorphs. The selective forces involved in the evolution of social parasitism are not fully understood, and it is unlikely that one model fits all relationships.

"Any hypothesis explaining the evolution of slavery in Polyergus must account both for the origin of group raiding with brood capture, and for non-independent colony foundation by queens". Topoff gives an adequate hypothesis to the evolution of Polyergus by integrating three processes: queen takeover, olfactory imprinting, and territorial fighting. Here are his main points. A free-living ancestor of Polyergus, that is a scavenger, would band together with others for intraspecific contest. Occasionally a queen invaded colonies of Formica. Initially the queen drove off the Formica queen and workers and appropriated the Formica pupae (he gives as example the queens of Formica wheeleri that do this now). The killing of the Formica queen and adoption by the workers evolved from this. His previous work (which was presented earlier) shows what would have evolved for adaptation to occur: "(1) sharp mandibles for killing the Formica queen, (2) a pheromone that reduces aggression from resident workers, (3) a tendency to hold onto the dead Formica queen long enough to absorb her odors...". The next step was olfactory imprinting between the two species, a consequence of living one's life from start to finish in the presence of both species. Polyergus' ancestor then forages and encounters a colony of the same species. Again, they recruit nestmates to a territorial raid. In a brilliant insight, Topoff suggest this trait explains the raiding behavior. The Polyergus worker, raised by Formica as conspecifics, "identifies individual of Formica as belonging to its own species, another territorial raid is incited. Thus from the standpoint of Polyergus... slave raids are equivalent to territorial raids". The captured brood is imprinted as well and they become workers in the original nest. As time went on "Our ancestral Polyergus could easily slide in the direction of facultative parasitism". Eventually, Polyergus ancestors lost the ability to take care of themselves and become the inquiline Polyergus we see today.
