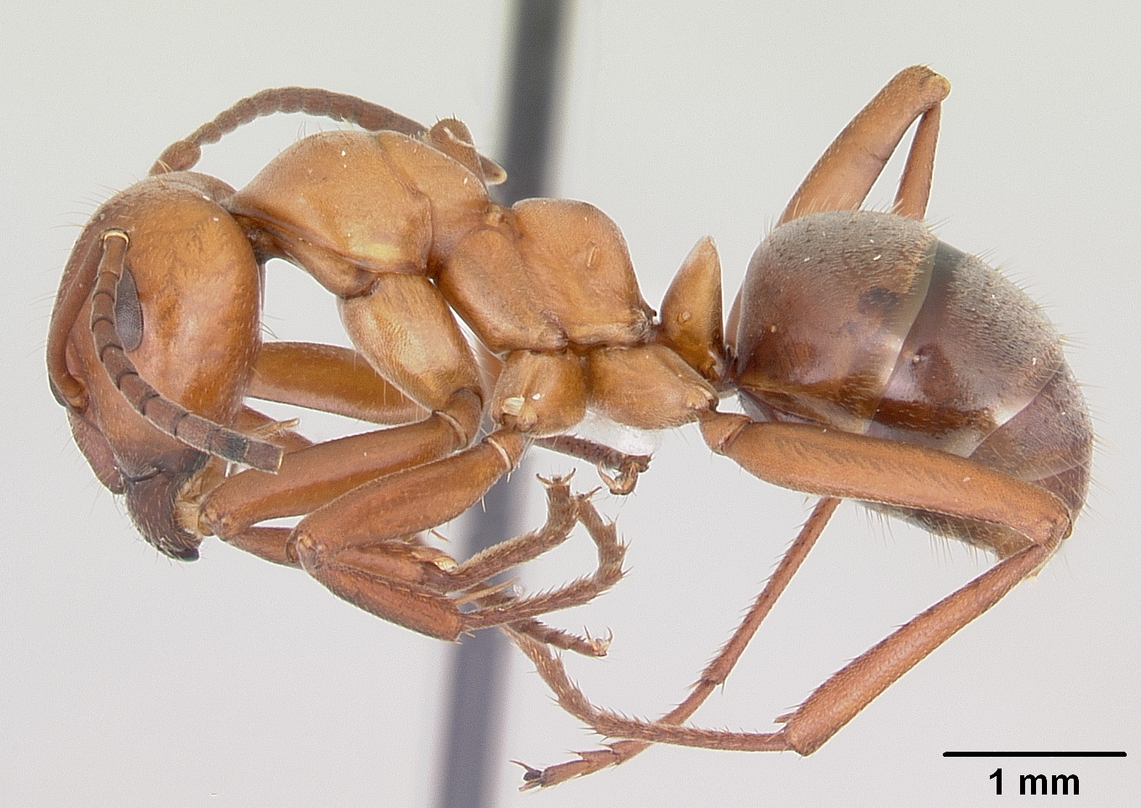
- Formica pergandei

Scientific classification
- Domain: Eukaryota
- Kingdom: Animalia
- Phylum: Arthropoda
- Class: Insecta
- Order: Hymenoptera
- Family: Formicidae
- Subfamily: Formicinae
- Genus: Formica
- Species: F. pergandei

Binomial name
- Formica pergandei Emery, 1893

= Formica pergandei =

Species of ant

Formica pergandei is a species of ant in the family Formicidae.
