= Konstantin Arnoldi =

Russian entomologist (1901–1982)

- Константин Владимирович Арнольди
- Born: Konstantin Vladimirovich Arnoldi; January 5, 1901; Moscow, Russian Empire
- Died: December 12, 1982 (aged 81); Moscow, Soviet Union
- Citizenship: Soviet
- Scientific career
- Fields: Entomology
- Institutions: Moscow State University

Konstantin Vladimirovich Arnoldi (Russian: Константин Владимирович Арнольди; 5 January 1901 – 12 December 1982) was a Soviet and Russian biologist and entomologist. He was the son of Vladimir Arnoldi.
