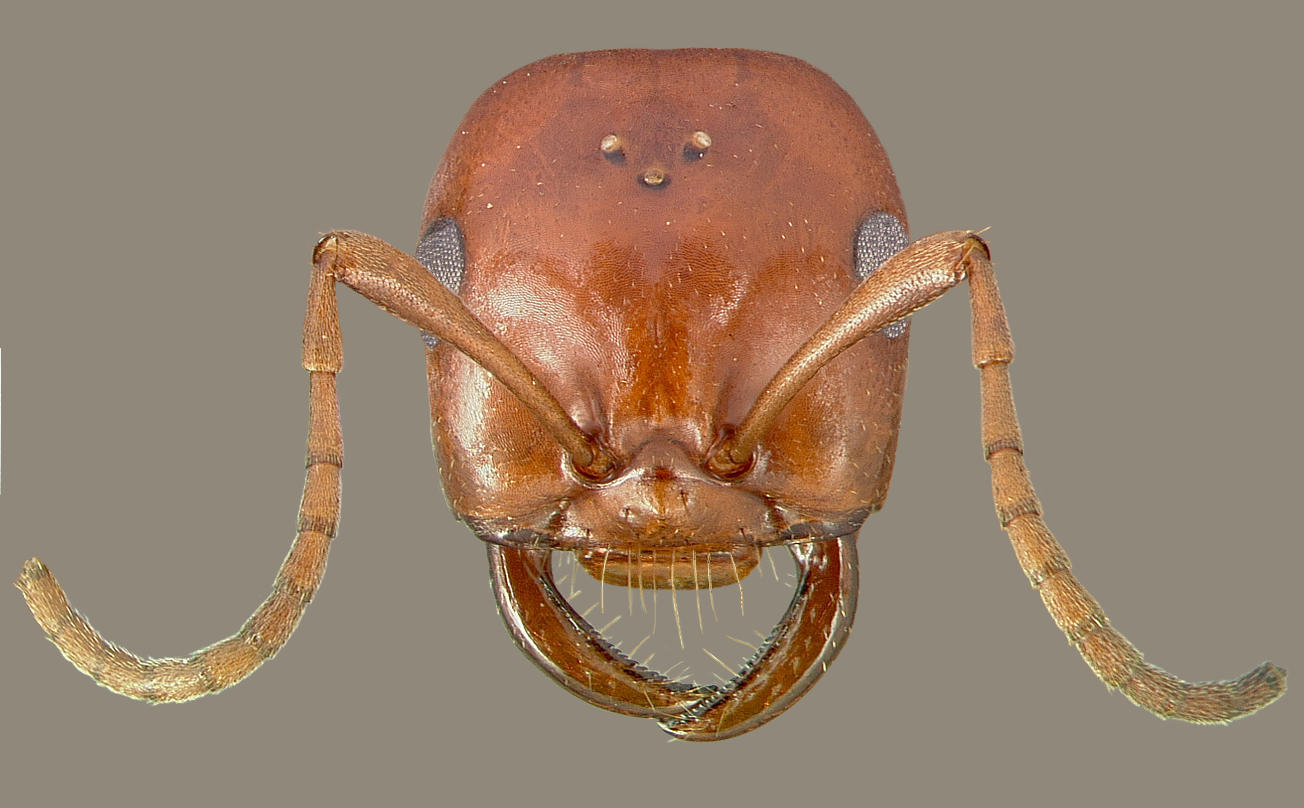
- Polyergus breviceps head, displaying the distinctive sickle-like jaws.
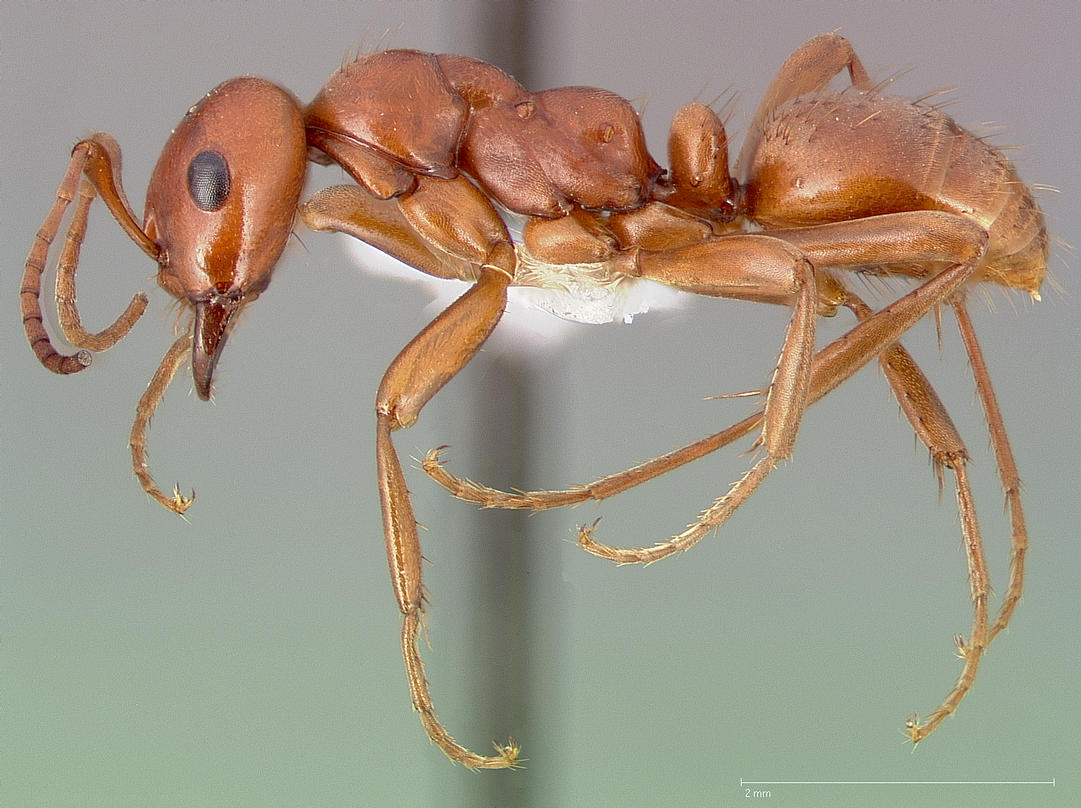
- Polyergus breviceps, lateral view.

Scientific classification
- Kingdom: Animalia
- Phylum: Arthropoda
- Class: Insecta
- Order: Hymenoptera
- Family: Formicidae
- Subfamily: Formicinae
- Tribe: Formicini
- Genus: Polyergus; Latreille, 1804

Type species
- Formica rufescens Latreille, 1798

Species
- 14 species

= Polyergus =

Genus of ants

Polyergus is a small genus of ants with 14 described species. They are also referred to by the names "slave-raiding ants" and "Amazon ants". They are characterized by their habit of raiding nests (of Formica) for workers.

== Reproduction ==
Polyergus workers are incapable of caring for brood, for the most part due to their dagger-like, piercing mandibles. As such, they have evolved to rely on certain species of ants in the genus Formica. They have lost the instinct for carrying out even rudimentary brood care, and even for feeding themselves (which they are unable to do). Polyergus 'workers' exist more as a force of improvised soldiers, acting in essence solely to raid the Formica nests. The captured ants are generally referred to as "slaves" in scientific and popular literature, though recent attempts have been made to apply other human cultural models. Some of these describe the Polyergus as "raiders", "pirates", or "kidnappers". They also describe the Formica workers as "helper-ants" or "domesticated animals".

As far as is known, all established Polyergus colonies have only one queen. However, many contain ergatoids, large, worker-like members with large gasters. These may be substitute reproductive individuals after the queen's death, but this has not been proven. To found a new colony, a lone Polyergus queen invades a nest of the host species, or encounters and moves in with a colony-founding queen of the host species and her first few workers. In the latter case, the host queen is allowed to survive until her little colony has reared a sufficient number of host workers to support the parasite queen, something the Polyergus queen cannot do herself. The young Polyergus queen then kills the existing Formica queen (immediately if sufficient workers are present, later if these are not yet reared) and becomes accepted by the Formica workers. These proceed to rear the first and all subsequent Polyergus brood. Clearly, this complicated and lengthy process often fails, as Polyergus colonies are relatively rare, though each mature colony produces dozens or hundreds of new potential queens each year. To counteract the natural mortality of the Formica worker population, Polyergus workers must conduct regular raids over a 6-8 week period, every summer over the 10- to 15-year lifespan of their colony.

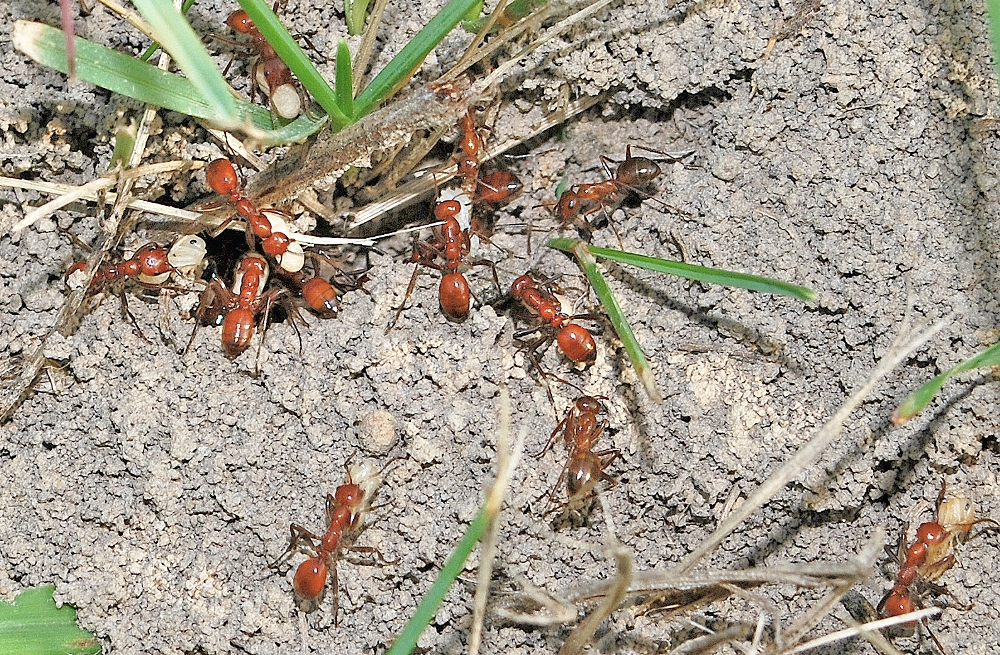
Polyergus lucidus returning from raid on Formica incerta: Three of the Formica ants already incorporated into the mixed colony are visible to the right of the nest entrance.

== Species ==
The genus Polyergus is split up into three groups, or "complexes". There is the lucidus group, the rufescens group, and the samurai group.

=== lucidus group ===
- Polyergus lucidus Mayr, 1870 – eastern United States, southern Ontario
- Polyergus longicornis Smith, 1947 – southeastern United States
- Polyergus montivagus Wheeler, 1915 – New England states to northern Florida in eastern United States, southern Ontario, Canada and west to Wisconsin and northern New Mexico, United States
- Polyergus oligergus Trager, 2013 – Florida, United States
- Polyergus ruber Trager, 2013 – southeastern United States
- Polyergus sanwaldi Trager, 2013 – United States, New England west to North Dakota

=== rufescens group ===
- Polyergus rufescens (Latreille, 1798) – all of Europe, to western China and Kazakhstan
- Polyergus breviceps Emery, 1893 – north-central United States, west to Colorado, northern Arizona
- Polyergus bicolor Wasmann, 1901 – Wisconsin and Michigan, United States, west to North Dakota and south-central Canada
- Polyergus mexicanus Forel, 1899 – Dakotas and Arkansas, to western United States and Canada, and south at high altitude in mountains of Durango, Mexico.
- Polyergus topoffi Trager, 2013 – high desert to mid-elevation mountains from Hidalgo, Mexico to southern Arizona, United States
- Polyergus vinosus Trager, 2013 – southern California to northern Baja California, Mexico

=== samurai group ===
- Polyergus nigerrimus Marikovsky, 1963 – Mongolia, Tuvan Republic, southern Russia
- Polyergus samurai Yano, 1911 – Japan, Korea, eastern China, southeastern Russia

incertae sedis

- Polyergus texanus – excluded from Polyergus by Trager (2013)

== See also ==
- Psithyrus, a species of bumblebee with a similar strategy of nest usurpation
