= Slave-making ant =

Species of ants that steal young ants of another species to contribute to their colony

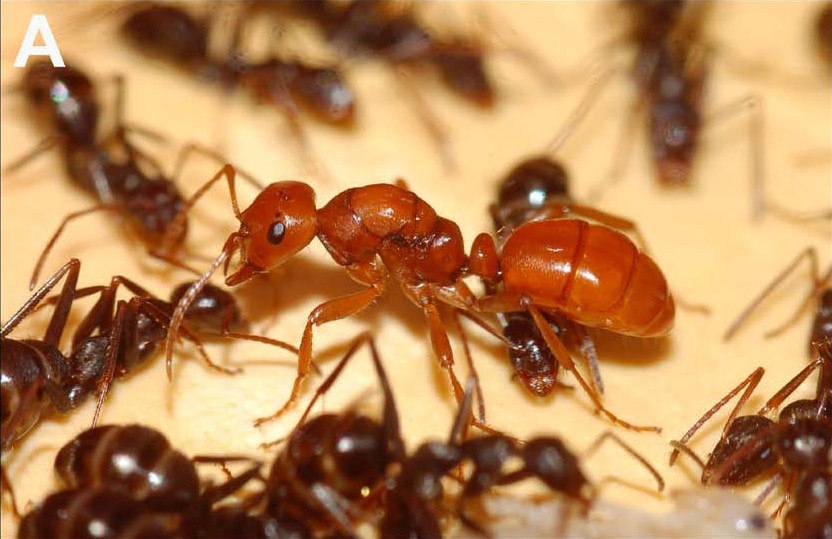
Queen and brood of the social parasite Polyergus lucidus with Formica archboldi workers

Slave-making ants or slaver ants are brood parasites that capture broods of other ant species to increase the worker force of their colony. After emerging in the slave-maker nest, slave workers work as if they were in their own colony, while parasite workers only concentrate on replenishing the labor force from neighboring host nests, a process called slave raiding.

The slave-making ants are specialized to parasitize a single species or a group of related species, and they are often close relatives to their hosts, which is typical for social parasites. The slave-makers may either be permanent social parasites (thus depending on enslaved ants throughout their whole lives) or facultative slave-makers. The behavior is unusual among ants but has evolved several times independently.

== Terminology ==
Among animals, theft of brood for the purpose of employing the stolen individual's efforts in support of the thief is formally called dulosis (from Greek δοῦλος 'slave'), but the term "slave-making" is considered synonymous.

Slaver ants were first described by the Genevan entomologist Pierre Huber in his 1810 book Recherches sur les mœurs des fourmis indigènes. He referred to the enslaved ants as "auxiliary ants". In 1820 the British translator of this book likened the enslaved ants to "Negro ants", and this naturalist account on slavery in the animal world caused a stir in the proslavery and antislavery discourse in the Atlantic world.

A related type of social parasitism is called inquilinism, in which a reproductive enters a host colony, lays eggs, and relies on the host colony to rear its offspring. Unlike brood parasitism, the inquiline remains within the nest and typically its brood does not outnumber the host's brood.

=== Obligate and facultative slave-makers ===
Slave-making ants may be permanent social parasites, thus depending on enslaved host ants throughout their whole lives and unable to function without them in which case they are termed obligate slave-makers. Alternatively, facultative slave-making ants, like those in the Formica sanguinea complex, represent an intermediate parasitic group, between free-living species and obligatory slave-making species. In laboratory tests, when captured workers were removed from colonies of Formica sanguinea and Polyergus rufescens, the behavior of F. sanguinea changed dramatically within 30 days of their removal, with workers becoming self-sufficient at feeding and brood care. Workers of Polyergus, in contrast, were unable to care for their brood, and experienced high mortality.

== Raids ==
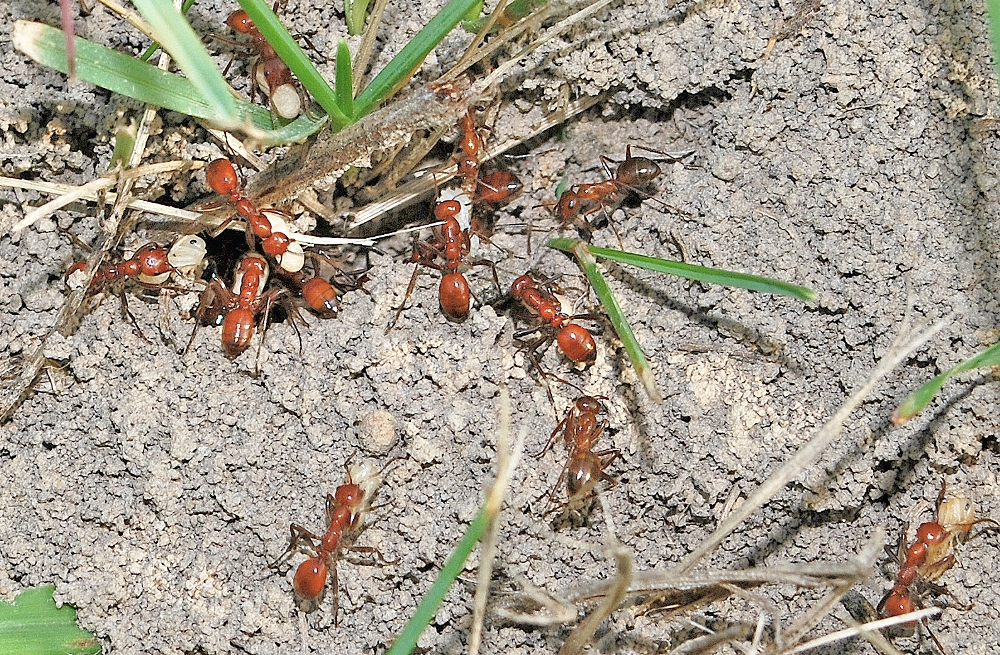
Polyergus lucidus returning from raid on Formica incerta. Two of the latter already incorporated into the mixed colony are visible to the right of the nest entrance.

Parasitized nests need to replenish the host workers periodically. This is achieved by raiding other nests in a process called slave raiding. The parasite workers are specialized for conducting raids in a two-step process. First, scouts individually search for potential host nests. When successful, the scout returns to its nest and recruits nest-mates to initiate the raid, during which slave-maker ants seize a brood and bring it back home. A colony may capture 14,000 pupae in a single season. Most slave-raiders capture only the young, but Strongylognathus sp. also enslave adult workers.

In most parasite species, workers mark the way to their nest with pheromones and afterwards fellow slave-makers are attracted within a few seconds. They then go quickly to the targeted host nest, attack it, and carrying as many larvae and pupae as possible, return to their nest following the same trail marked by the pheromone. Rossomyrmex is the only reported slave-maker that exclusively uses adult transport and single recruitment chain instead of pheromones during raids, a behavior probably constrained by the arid habitat; raids take place in early summer when soil surface temperature can reach up to 30 °C (86 °F), a temperature in which pheromones would quickly evaporate.

Workers of the attacked nest can fight or flee. In the host species Proformica, the most common behavior is flee, probably because hosts almost always lose fights. Most studies on the raiding behavior of species in the F. sanguinea complex confirm that slave raiders usually rout their opponents, who typically flee in a state of panicked alarm, and that aggressive encounters, when they occur, are brief and do not result in the death of adult individuals from either species. However, when large colonies of slave species offer resistance during raids prolonged fighting is possible and many workers of both species can be killed.

Later, host workers emerging in the parasite nest will be imprinted on and integrated into the mixed colony where they will rear the parasite brood, feed and groom the parasite workers, defend the nest against aliens (e.g. other insects or spiders), and even participate in raids, including those against their original colony. Altruistic acts of slaves are thus directed toward unrelated individuals. One hypothesis suggests that slave deception is possible because slaves are captured as pupae and learn the slave-maker colony odor after emergence.

However, in some cases, the enslaved ants rebel against their slave-maker ants, killing a large number of the slave-maker ant offspring. This is because "slaves can gain indirect fitness benefits by reducing parasite pressure on nearby host colonies, because these are often closely related to the slaves". Thus, the slave ants protect their native colonies from further raids by slave-maker ants.

== Parasite–host pairs ==
- Rossomyrmex–Proformica
- Polyergus–Formica
- Formica–Formica
- Leptothorax–Chalepoxenus
- Leptothorax–Epimyrma
- Leptothorax–Harpagoxenus
- Leptothorax–Leptothorax
- Leptothorax–Protomognathus
- Myrmoxenus–Temnothorax
- Strongylognathus–Tetramorium

== Reproduction ==
The reproductive behavior of slave-making ants usually consists in synchronous emergence of sexuals followed by a nuptial flight and the invasion of a host nest, but also in some cases females display a mating call around the natal nest to attract males and immediately after mating search for a host nest to usurp.

Only one slave species is usually found in a single Polyergus nest. This is in contrast to related facultative slave-makers of the genus Formica belonging to the F. sanguinea species group, found in the same habitat, whose nests commonly contain two or more species serving as slaves. Choice of a host species can occur both through the colony-founding behavior of queens and through the choice of target nests for slave raids. The parasitic Polyergus queens found colonies either by adoption, where a queen invades the nest of a slave species, killing the resident queen and appropriating workers and brood present, or by "budding", in which a queen invades or is accepted into a host species nest accompanied by workers from her nest of origin.

== Evolution ==
The first hypothesis concerning the origins of slave-making was Darwin's (1859) suggestion in On the Origin of Species that slavery developed as a by-product of brood predation among related species. Other hypotheses focus on territorial interactions with opportunistic brood predation or brood transport among polydomous colonies (consist of multiple nests) as the main pathway to slave-making. Slave-making behavior is unusual among ants but has evolved independently more than ten times in total including in the subfamilies Myrmicinae and Formicinae. Slave-makers and their hosts are often close phylogenetic relatives, which is typical for social parasites and their respective hosts (formalized as Emery's rule). This has major evolutionary implications since it may argue for sympatric speciation.

Raids can jeopardize host colony survival, therefore exerting a strong selection pressure upon the hosts. Reciprocally, there is some evidence that hosts also exert a selection pressure on their parasites in return, since resistance by host colonies might prevent enslavement. Coevolutionary processes between slave-making ant species and their hosts then can escalate to an evolutionary arms race.

== See also ==
- Host–parasite coevolution
- Kleptoparasitism
- Trophobiosis

== Sources ==
- Blatrix, R. S.; Sermage, C. (2005), "Role of early experience in ant enslavement: A comparative analysis of a host and a non-host species", Frontiers in Zoology, 2 13, doi:10.1186/1742-9994-2-13, PMC 1199612, PMID 16076389
- Breed, M. D.; Cook, C.; Krasnec, M. O. (2012), "Cleptobiosis in Social Insects", Psyche: A Journal of Entomology, 2012: 1–7, doi:10.1155/2012/484765
- Delattre, O.; Blatrix, R. S.; Châline, N.; Chameron, S. P.; Fédou, A.; Leroy, C.; Jaisson, P. (2012), "Do host species evolve a specific response to slave-making ants?", Frontiers in Zoology, 9 (38): 1–10, doi:10.1186/1742-9994-9-38, PMC 3551654, PMID 23276325
- D'Ettorre, Patrizia; Heinze, Jürgen (2001), "Sociobiology of slave-making ants", Acta Ethologica, 3 (2): 67–82, doi:10.1007/s102110100038, S2CID 37840769
- Fénéron, R. E.; Poteaux, C.; Boilève, M.; Valenzuela, J.; Savarit, F. (2013), "Discrimination of the Social Parasite Ectatomma parasiticum by Its Host Sibling Species (E. Tuberculatum)", Psyche: A Journal of Entomology, 2013: 1–11, doi:10.1155/2013/573541
- Goodloe, L.; Sanwald, R. (1985), "Host Specificity in Colony-Founding by Polyergus Lucidus Queens (Hymenoptera: Formicidae)", Psyche: A Journal of Entomology, 92 (2–3): 297, doi:10.1155/1985/69513
- Goodloe, L. P.; Topoff, H. (1987), "Pupa Acceptance by Slaves of the Social-Parasitic Ant, Polyergus (Hymenoptera: Formicidae)", Psyche: A Journal of Entomology, 94 (3–4): 293–302, doi:10.1155/1987/48360
- Goropashnaya, A. V.; Fedorov, V. B.; Seifert, B.; Pamilo, P. (2012), Chaline, Nicolas (ed.), "Phylogenetic Relationships of Palaearctic Formica Species (Hymenoptera, Formicidae) Based on Mitochondrial Cytochrome b Sequences", PLOS ONE, 7 (7): 1–7, Bibcode:2012PLoSO...741697G, doi:10.1371/journal.pone.0041697, PMC 3402446, PMID 22911845
- Herbers, J. M. (2007), "Watch Your Language! Racially Loaded Metaphors in Scientific Research", BioScience, 57 (2): 104–105, doi:10.1641/B570203, S2CID 84617477
- King, JR; Trager, JC (2007), "Natural history of the slave making ant, Polyergus lucidus, sensu lato in northern Florida and its three Formica pallidefulva group hosts.", Journal of Insect Science, 7 (42): 1–14, doi:10.1673/031.007.4201, PMC 2999504, PMID 20345317
- Miramontes, Octavio (1993). Complexity and behaviour in Leptothorax ants. CopIt ArXives. ISBN 978-0-9831172-2-3.
- Mori, A.; D'Ettorre, P.; Le Moli, F. (1994), "Mating and post-mating behaviour of the European amazon ant, Polyergus rufescens (Hymenoptera, Formicidae)", Bolletino di Zoologia, 61 (3): 203–206, doi:10.1080/11250009409355886
- Pennings, Pleuni S.; Pamminger, Tobias; Foitzik, Susanne; Metzler, Dirk (4 December 2012). "Oh sister, where art thou? Indirect fitness benefit could maintain a host defense trait". arXiv:1212.0790 [q-bio.PE].
- Ruano, F.; Sanllorente, O.; Lenoir, A.; Tinaut, A. (2013), "Rossomyrmex, the Slave-Maker Ants from the Arid Steppe Environments", Psyche: A Journal of Entomology, 2013: 1–7, doi:10.1155/2013/541804, hdl:10481/98053
- Topoff, H. (1999), "Slave-making queens", Scientific American, 281 (5): 84–90, Bibcode:1999SciAm.281e..84T, doi:10.1038/scientificamerican1199-84
- Topoff, H.; Zimmerli, E. (1991), "Formica Wheeleri: Darwin's Predatory Slave-Making Ant?", Psyche: A Journal of Entomology, 98 (4): 309–317, doi:10.1155/1991/34829
