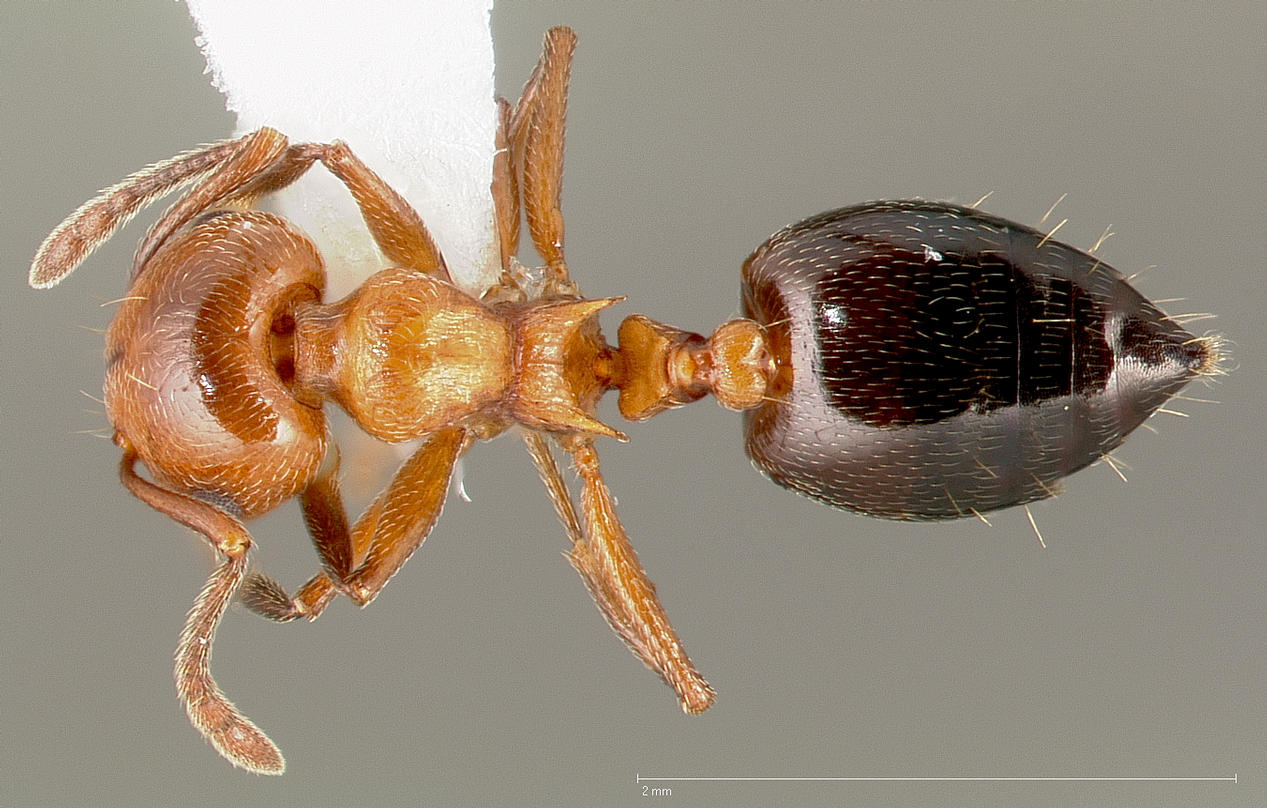

Scientific classification
- Domain: Eukaryota
- Kingdom: Animalia
- Phylum: Arthropoda
- Class: Insecta
- Order: Hymenoptera
- Family: Formicidae
- Subfamily: Myrmicinae
- Tribe: Crematogastrini
- Genus: Crematogaster
- Species: C. hespera

Binomial name
- Crematogaster hespera Buren, 1968

= Crematogaster hespera =

Species of ant

Crematogaster hespera is a species of ant in the family Formicidae.

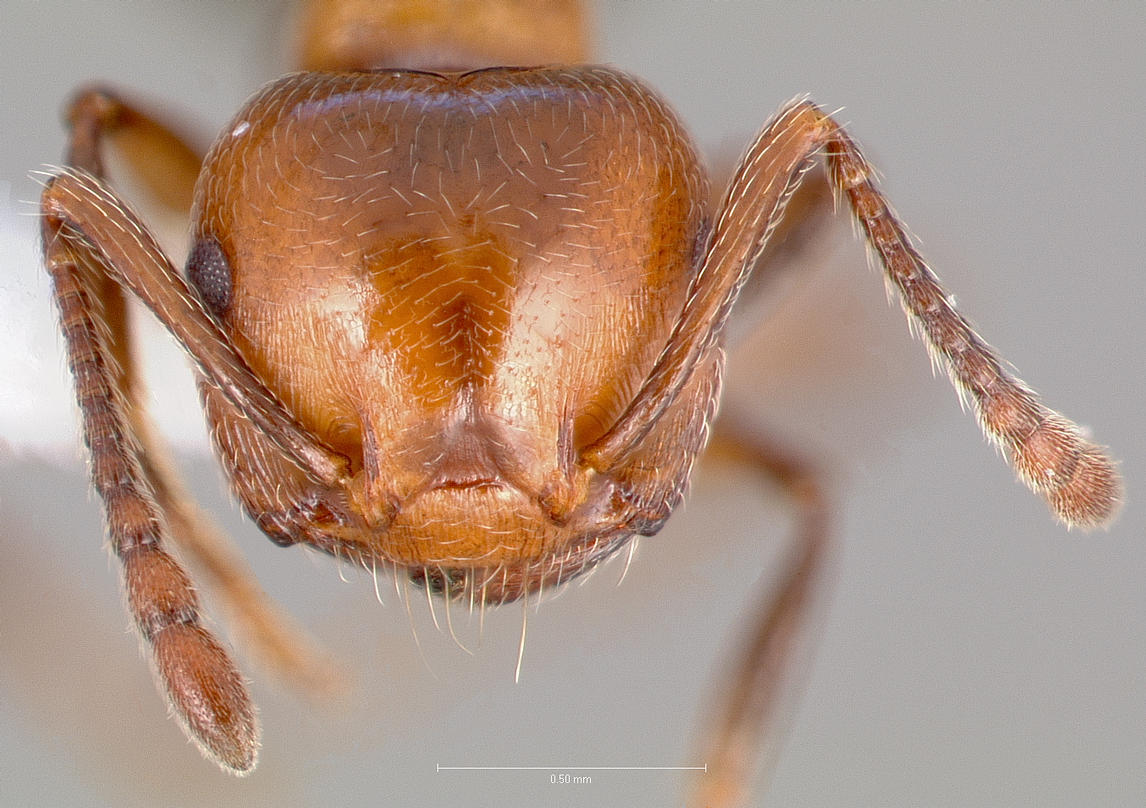

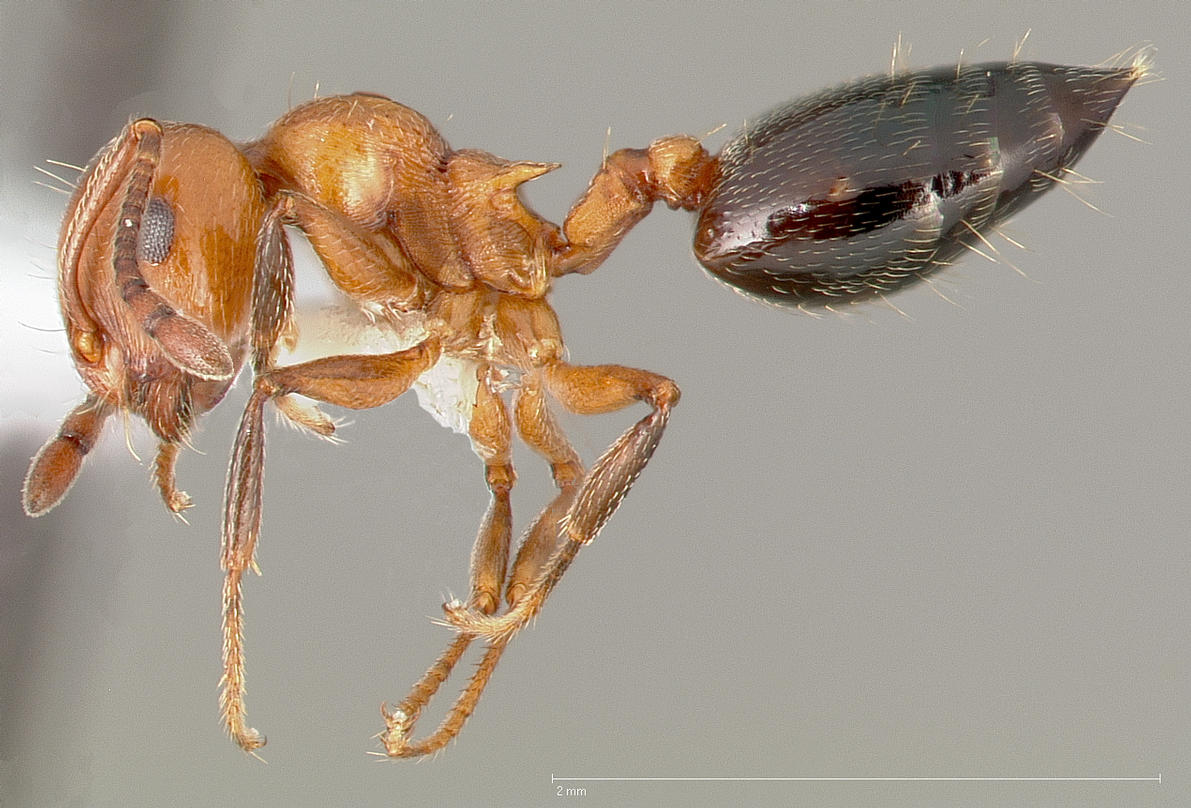
