= Crematogaster agniae =

Scientific classification
- Domain: Eukaryota
- Kingdom: Animalia
- Phylum: Arthropoda
- Class: Insecta
- Order: Hymenoptera
- Family: Formicidae
- Subfamily: Myrmicinae
- Genus: Crematogaster
- Species: C. agniae

Binomial name
- Crematogaster agniae Karavaiev, 1935

Species of ant

Crematogaster agniae is a species of ant in tribe Crematogastrini. It was described by Vladimir Karavaiev in 1935. It is found in Vietnam and is part of the Crematogaster genus.
