= Crematogaster rogeri =

Scientific classification
- Kingdom: Animalia
- Phylum: Arthropoda
- Clade: Pancrustacea
- Class: Insecta
- Order: Hymenoptera
- Family: Formicidae
- Subfamily: Myrmicinae
- Genus: Crematogaster
- Species: C. rogeri

Binomial name
- Crematogaster rogeri Emery, 1922

Species of ant

Crematogaster rogeri is a species of ant of the subfamily Myrmicinae. It can be found from Sri Lanka.
