= Crematogaster concava =

Scientific classification
- Kingdom: Animalia
- Phylum: Arthropoda
- Clade: Pancrustacea
- Class: Insecta
- Order: Hymenoptera
- Family: Formicidae
- Subfamily: Myrmicinae
- Genus: Crematogaster
- Species: C. concava

Binomial name
- Crematogaster concava Emery, 1899

Species of ant

Crematogaster concava is a species of ant in tribe Crematogastrini. It was described by Emery in 1899.
