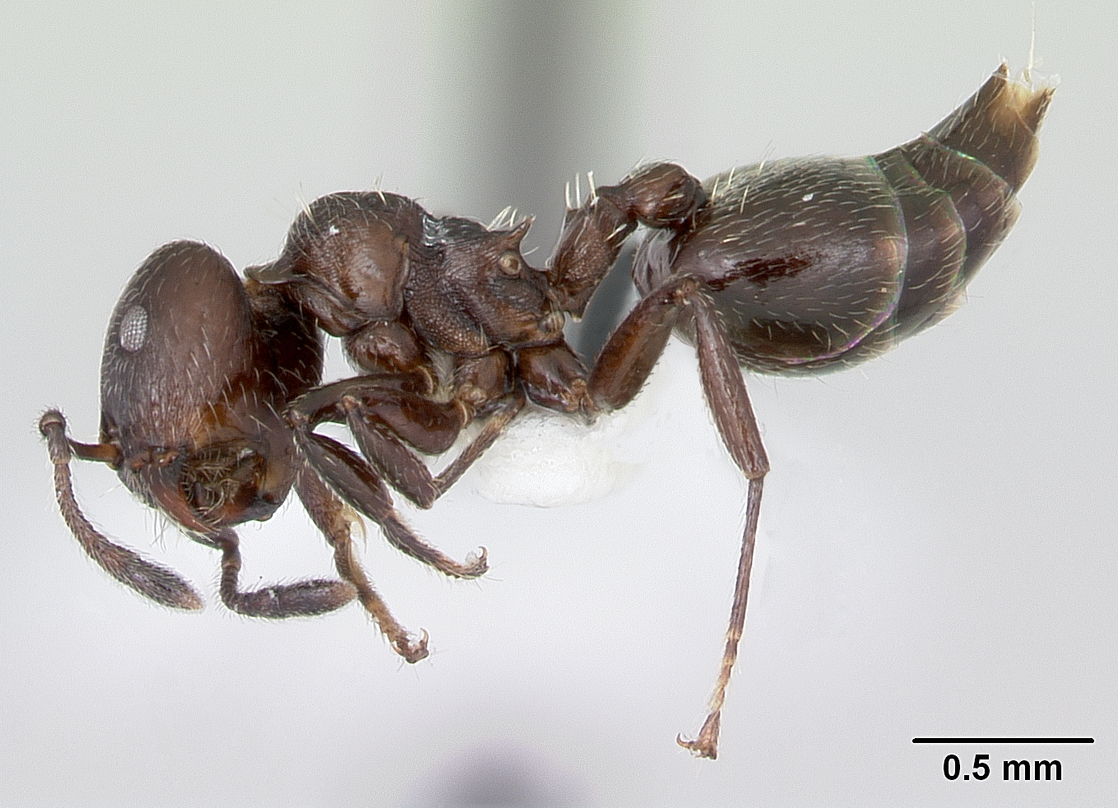

Scientific classification
- Domain: Eukaryota
- Kingdom: Animalia
- Phylum: Arthropoda
- Class: Insecta
- Order: Hymenoptera
- Family: Formicidae
- Subfamily: Myrmicinae
- Genus: Crematogaster
- Species: C. ampla

Binomial name
- Crematogaster ampla Powell, 2014

= Crematogaster ampla =

Species of ant

Crematogaster ampla is a species of ant in tribe Crematogastrini. It was described by Powell in 2014.
