= Crematogaster amapaensis =

Scientific classification
- Domain: Eukaryota
- Kingdom: Animalia
- Phylum: Arthropoda
- Class: Insecta
- Order: Hymenoptera
- Family: Formicidae
- Subfamily: Myrmicinae
- Genus: Crematogaster
- Species: C. amapaensis

Binomial name
- Crematogaster amapaensis Kampf, 1960

Species of ant

Crematogaster amapaensis is a species of ant in tribe Crematogastrini. It was described by Kempf in 1960.
