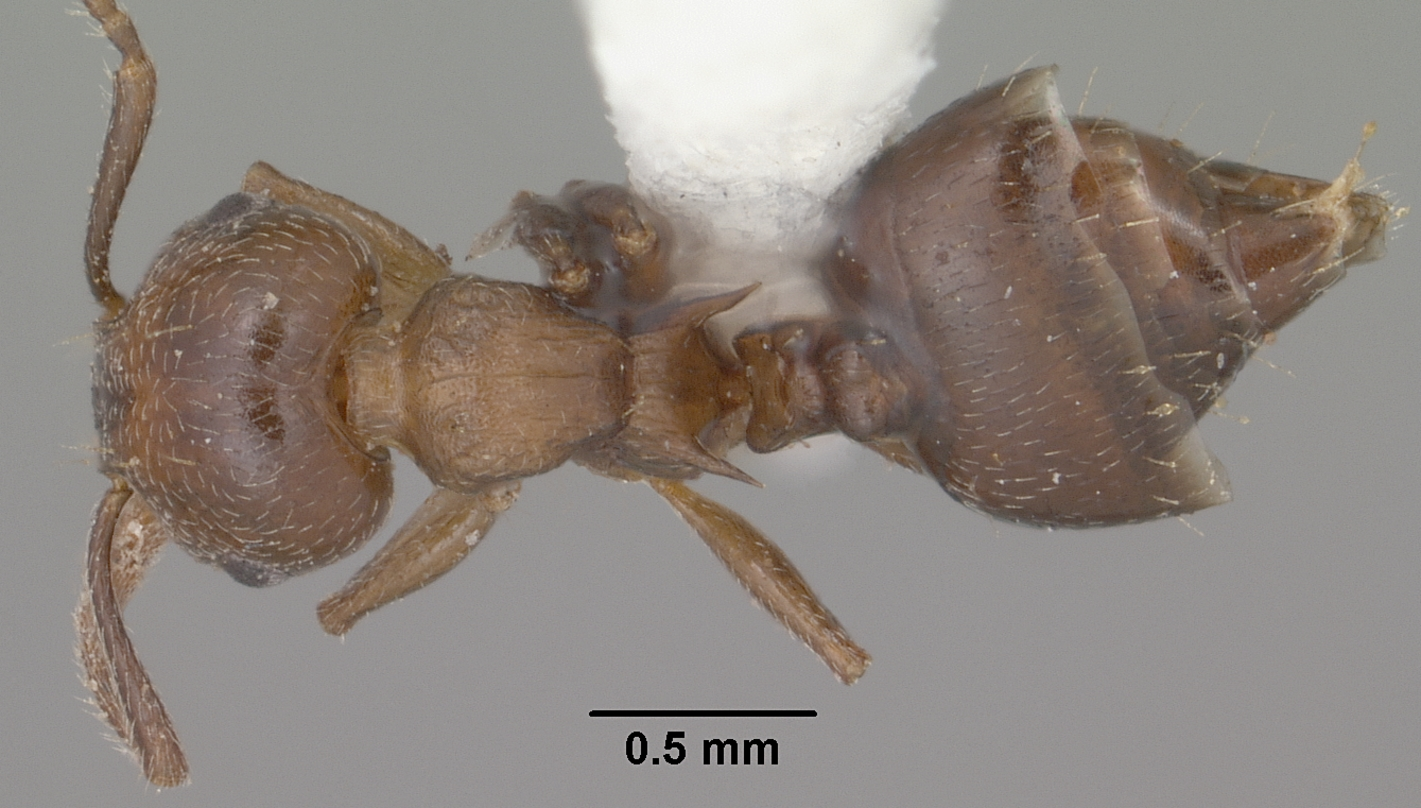

Scientific classification
- Domain: Eukaryota
- Kingdom: Animalia
- Phylum: Arthropoda
- Class: Insecta
- Order: Hymenoptera
- Family: Formicidae
- Subfamily: Myrmicinae
- Tribe: Crematogastrini
- Genus: Crematogaster
- Species: C. emeryana

Binomial name
- Crematogaster emeryana Creighton, 1950

= Crematogaster emeryana =

Species of ant

Crematogaster emeryana is a species of ant in the family Formicidae.

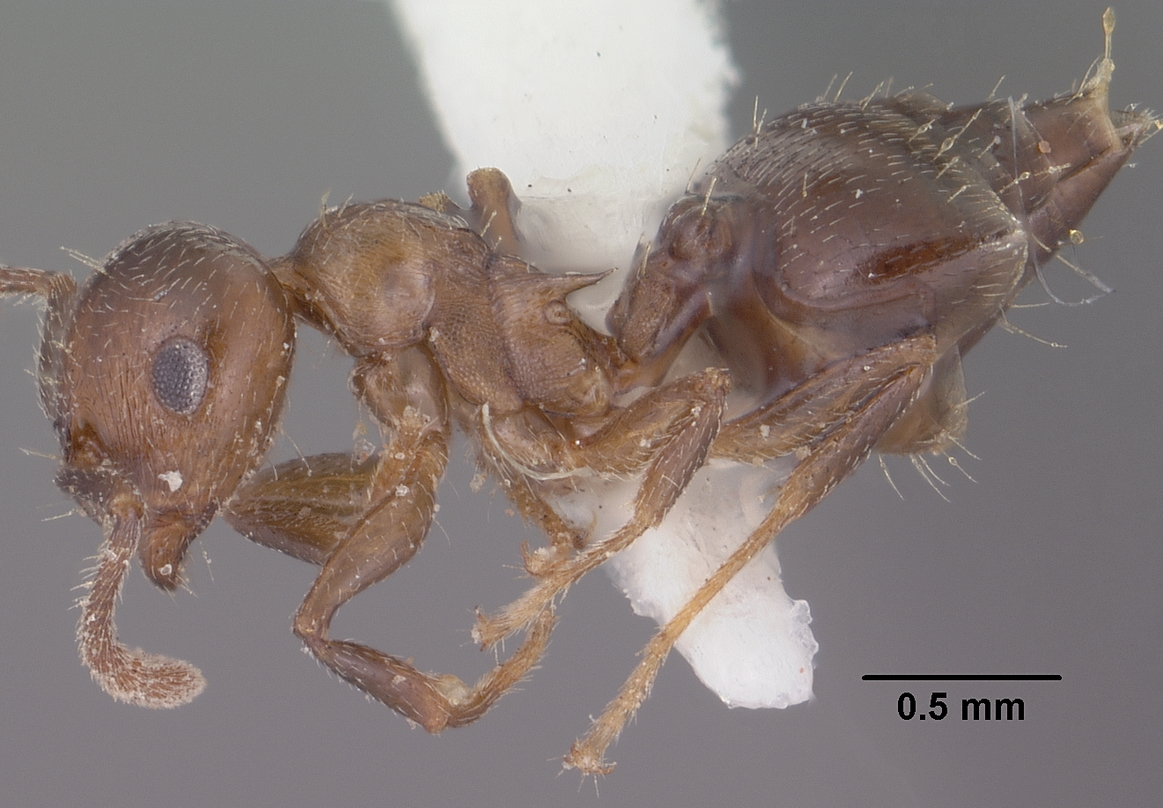
