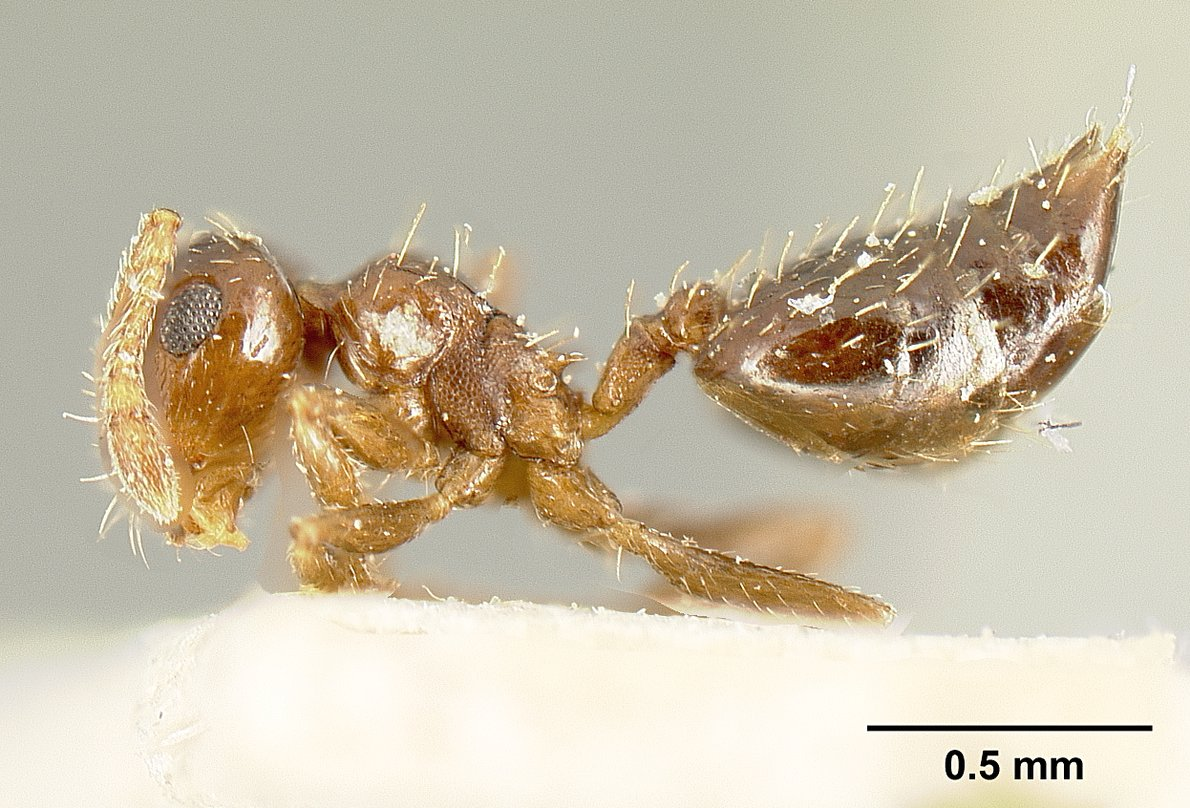

Scientific classification
- Kingdom: Animalia
- Phylum: Arthropoda
- Clade: Pancrustacea
- Class: Insecta
- Order: Hymenoptera
- Family: Formicidae
- Subfamily: Myrmicinae
- Genus: Crematogaster
- Species: C. abstinens

Binomial name
- Crematogaster abstinens Forel, 1899

= Crematogaster abstinens =

Species of ant

Crematogaster abstinens is a species of ant in tribe Crematogastrini. It was described by Forel in 1899.
