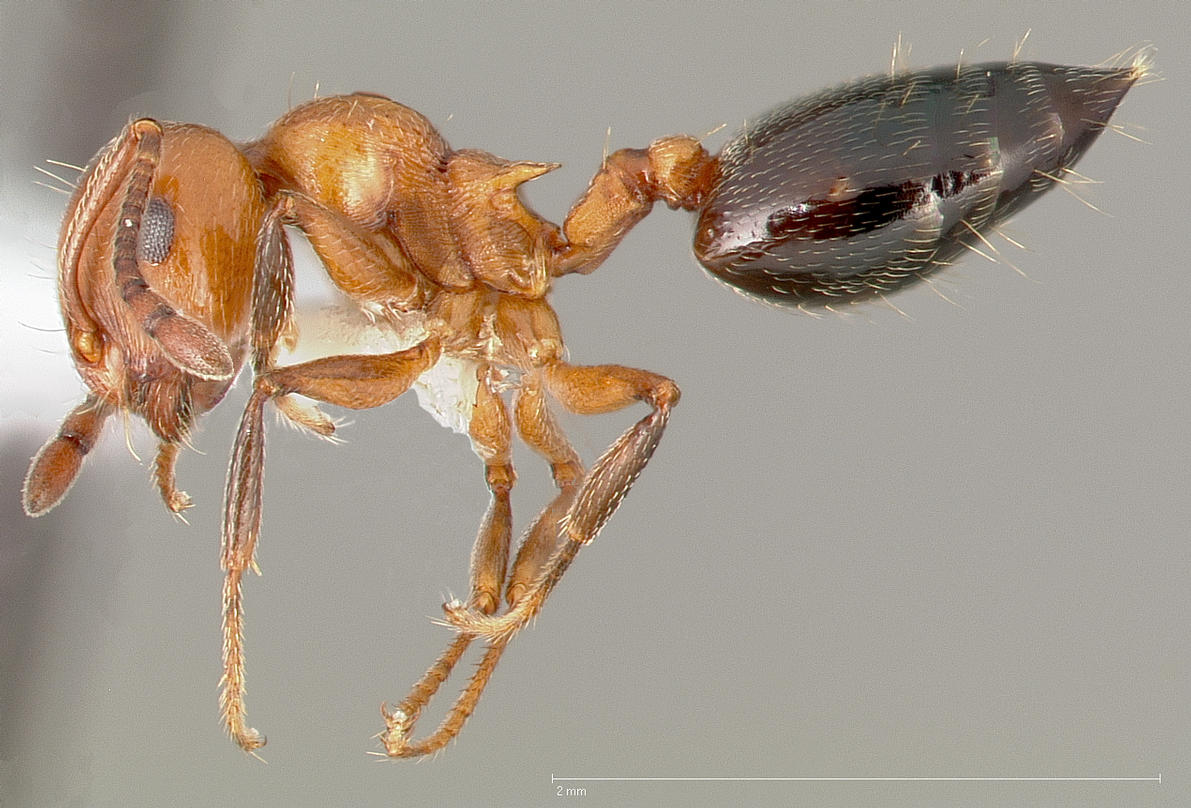
- C. hespera worker

Scientific classification
- Kingdom: Animalia
- Phylum: Arthropoda
- Clade: Pancrustacea
- Class: Insecta
- Order: Hymenoptera
- Family: Formicidae
- Subfamily: Myrmicinae
- Tribe: Crematogastrini
- Alliance: Crematogaster genus group
- Genus: Crematogaster; Lund, 1831

Diversity
- 527 species

= Crematogaster =

Crematogaster Temporal range: Eocene-present, 46–0 Ma

Genus of ants

Crematogaster is an ecologically diverse genus of ants found worldwide, which are characterised by a distinctive heart-shaped gaster (abdomen), which gives them one of their common names, the Saint Valentine ant. Members of this genus are also known as cocktail ants because of their habit of raising their abdomens when alarmed. Most species are arboreal (tree-dwelling). These ants are also known as acrobat ants.

Cocktail ants acquire food largely through predation on other insects, such as wasps. They use venom to stun their prey and a complex trail-laying process to lead comrades to food sources. Like most ants, Crematogaster species reproduce by partaking in nuptial flights, where the queen acquires the sperm used to fertilize every egg throughout her life.

== Habitat and ecology ==
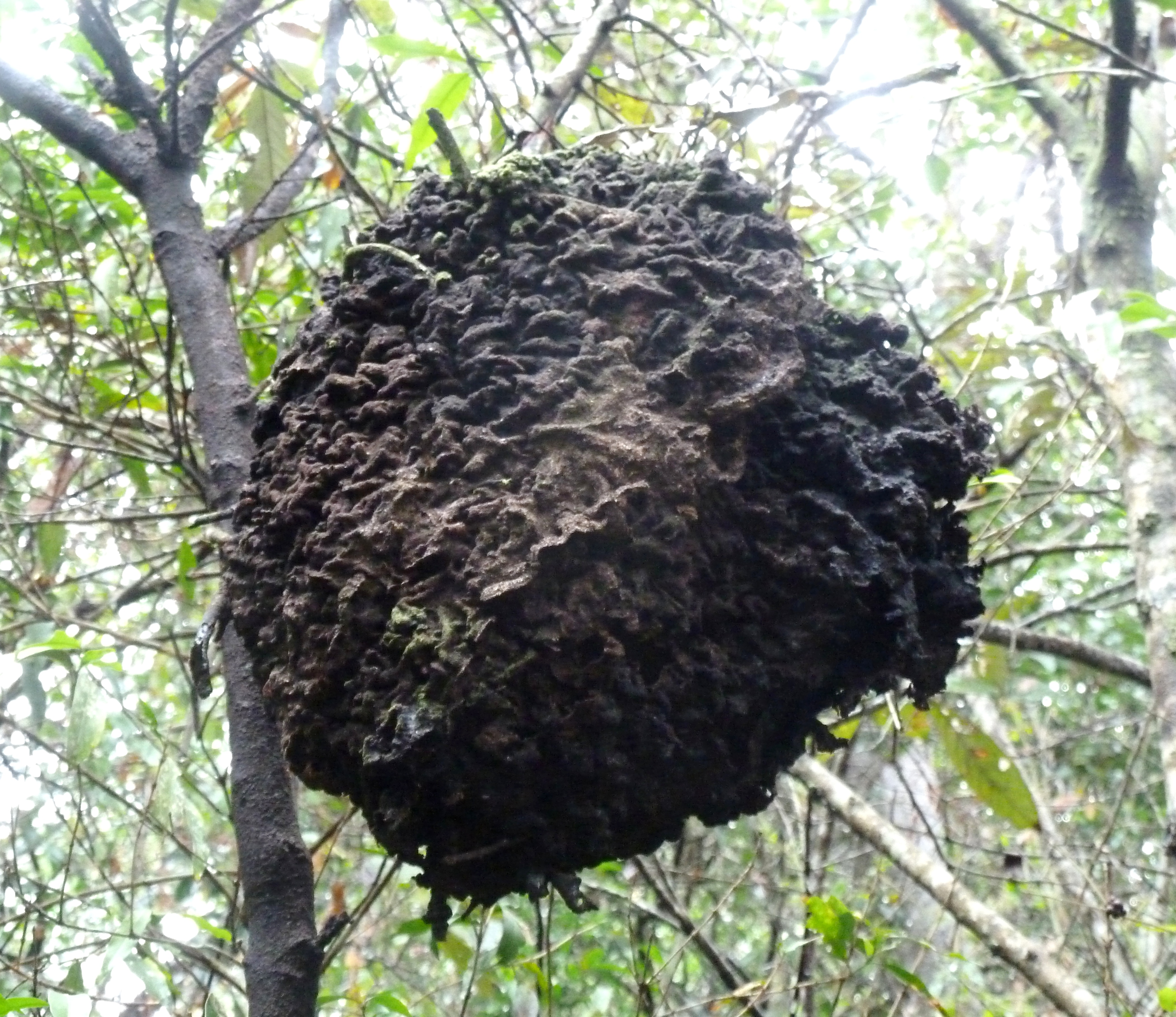
Arboreal carton nest of C. castanea

Cocktail ants can be found either outdoors or indoors with great frequency in each case. Outdoors, they are usually arboreal, but they often live in many common areas in the wild. These areas are typically moist and are often dark. They can often be found in trees, collections of wood (like firewood), and under rocks. Indoors, nests have been found inside homes around electrical wires. These locations are often very near large food supplies and may be around other ant nests.

Cocktail ants participate in a form of mutualism called myrmecophytism, in which plants provide shelter and secreted food, while the ants provide the plants with protection from predators. Many cocktail ants use plants such as Macaranga as their main source of food. The ants become alarmed when the plant is disturbed. They quickly emerge from their plant shelter and become aggressive. This can be the case even when neighboring plants are under attack. They can also recruit other ants to help in their defense. 3-Octanone and 3-Octanol have been identified as the alarm pheromones of East African Crematogaster negriceps and Crematogaster mimosa. The major components of the mandibular secretion of the Costa Rican Crematogaster rochai are also 3-octanone and 3-octanol.

Crematogaster ants have been seen attacking the seedpods of I.hexagona for unclear reasons. The damage opens the way for mold fungi such as Cladosporium and Fusarium to colonize the capsules, but also provide access to Loberus impressus pleasing fungus beetles, which feed on these fungi.

== Behavior ==
=== Division of labor ===
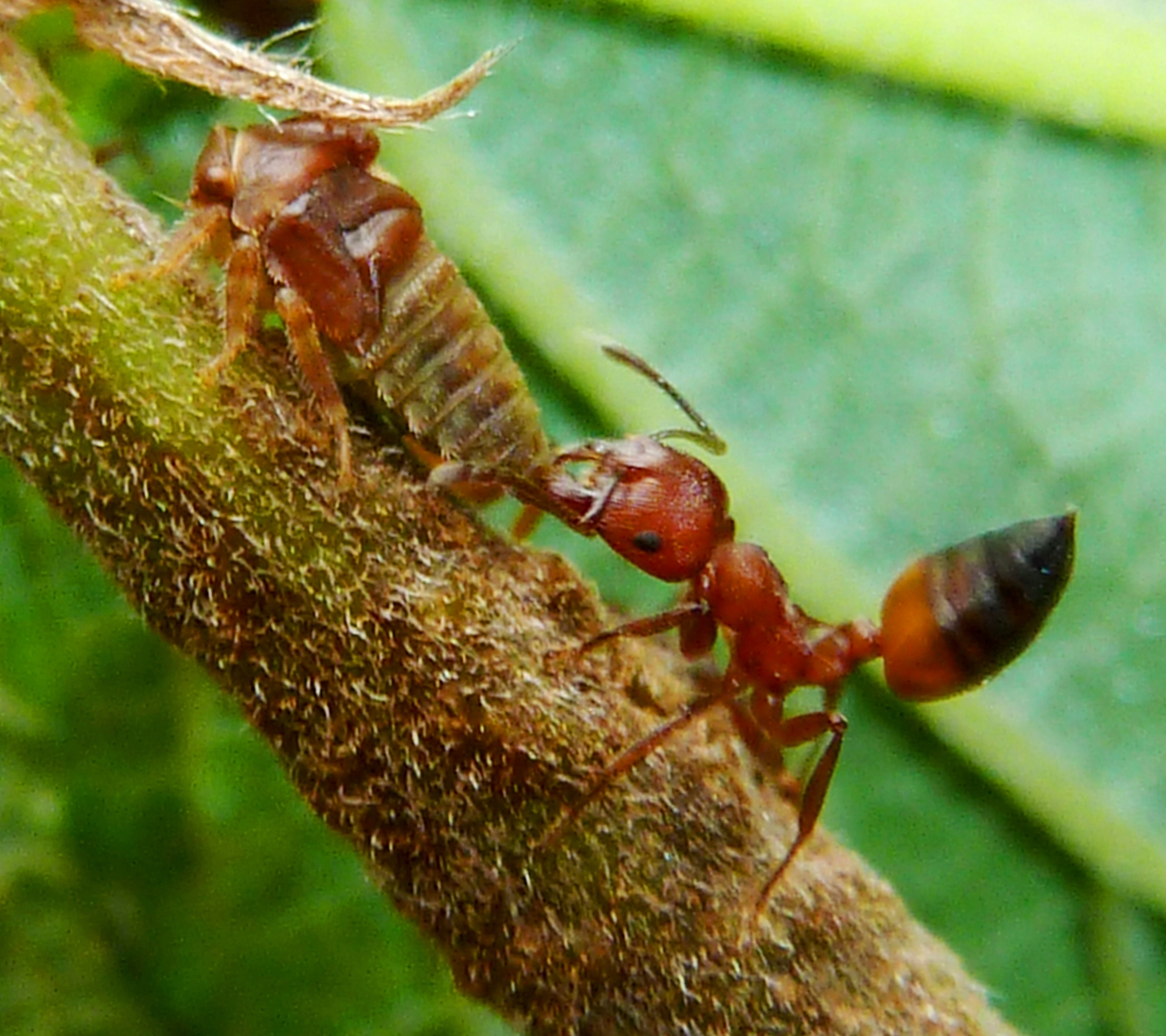
C. castanea worker tending a treehopper in a pigeonwood tree

As with most eusocial insects, cocktail ants tend to form castes based on labor duties. This division is normally behavioral, but also has a physical basis, including size or age. Soldiers are typically larger with a more developed metapleural gland specialized for colony defence or food acquisition. A worker ant is generally smaller than soldiers and queens, and its main task is to assist the queen in rearing the young. Workers vary in size more than soldiers. This considerable variation in size may have played a considerable role in the evolution of "large workers" in this genus.

=== Reproduction ===
As with many social ant species, in cocktail ants, a queen mates with a single male during a nuptial flight. During this flight, the winged queen and winged male mate, and the male dies shortly afterwards. The female eventually lands and removes her own wings, which she no longer needs.

In these ant species, a variation also exists to this mating strategy. Large female workers exist that are smaller than winged queens, yet larger than small workers. They also have many anatomical features that are intermediate to small workers and the queen, including ovary size and composition, and patches. These females can produce unfertilized eggs that can eventually develop into males in colonies that do not have a queen. If these eggs are produced in a colony with a queen, the queen can devour them. Larvae can also devour the eggs. Large workers normally produce more eggs in ant colonies that are queenless. Large workers can be tended to by small workers in a similar manner to ant queens.

=== Trail-laying ===
Cocktail ants lay scent trails for many different reasons - communication, recruitment of workers, etc. The scents originate in the tibial gland and are secreted from the gaster of the ants. The gaster never actually touches the surface of what the ant is leaving the scent on. When laying a scent trail, the ants will typically lift their abdomen sharply upward then bend it forward.

One practical use for trail laying is to mark the path toward food. The ants often find a food source requiring them to make multiple trips to the nest or shelter. To keep track of space, a scent is useful. Another significant use of a scent is to recruit other workers. This is actually helpful in a number of scenarios. It can increase efficiency when a food source is located and needs to be brought back to the nest. It can also be helpful in recruiting assistance during an attack on one of the cocktail ants' plant shelters.

=== Predatory behavior ===
Cocktail ants hunt both large and small prey. When time to hunt, foragers typically recruit nearby ants to assist them. The ants can mark and detect their prey by specific contact. When they make contact, they attack, sometimes releasing a small amount of venom with a sting. They also release an alarm pheromone to alert still more workers that prey has been seized. If other workers are present, the ants "spread-eagle" the prey. When the prey is spread-eagled, all limbs are outstretched and it is carried along the backsides of the ants. The ants carry arolia, pad-like projections that are used to carry the prey back to the nest. These arolia are critical because cocktail ants are arboreal and often need to travel up trees to return to their nesting location. If the prey is small and only one ant is present, it can carry the prey individually. If other workers are present, the ant recruits carrying assistance, even if the prey is small. Cocktail ants typically eat grasshoppers, termites, wasps, and other small insects. South American Crematogaster ants are also known to feed on egg sacs and spiderlings from the colonies of the social spider Anelosimus eximius.

Predation of wasps
Cocktail ants are known to eat different types of wasps. Many of these wasps have mutualistic relationships with trees involving pollination. Additionally, the wasps typically have cycles that they follow, which can make locating and capturing them by the ants more difficult. As a result, cocktail ants have evolved unique characteristics to detect the presence of prey. They have become sensitive to chemical signals released by wasps, and use these signals as cues in locating their prey.

=== Defensive behavior ===
Crematogaster ants "are able to raise their abdomens forward and over their thoraces and heads, which allow them to point their abdominal tips in nearly all directions", "as if they were performing a balancing act", thus they are colloquially known as "cocktail ants" or "acrobat ants".

When in conflict, cocktail ants can release a venom by flexing their abdominal regions. The effectiveness of the venom varies greatly with the opposer to the ant. For example, some other ant species are not very resistant and can be killed with only a few drops, while other ant species and insects have a high degree of resistance to even large amounts of venom. However, the venom can often repel offending ants if it comes into contact with their antennae. Cocktail ants are typically not repelled by venom from other cocktail ants. The venom is created in a metapleural gland and usually consists of complex and simple phenols and carboxylic acids, some of which have known antibiotic properties. The ants apply froths to conflicting organisms. The froths are applied in a "paintbrush" style manner to surround the offender. "Frothing" has evolved independently in ants and grasshoppers.

== Species ==
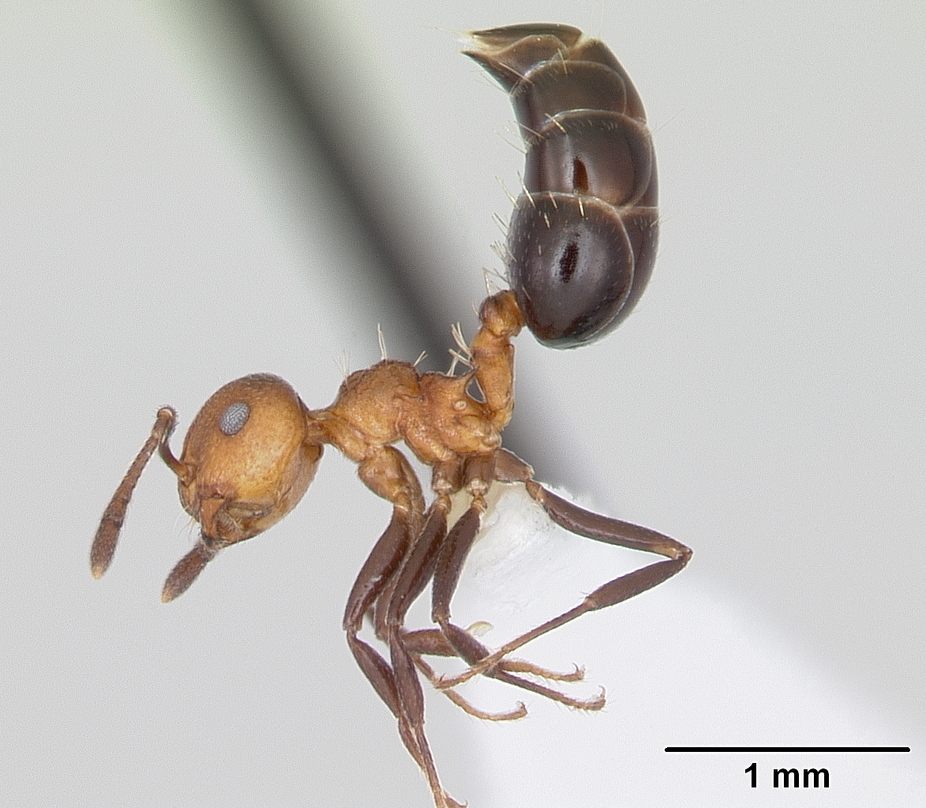
Worker caste of C. corticicola

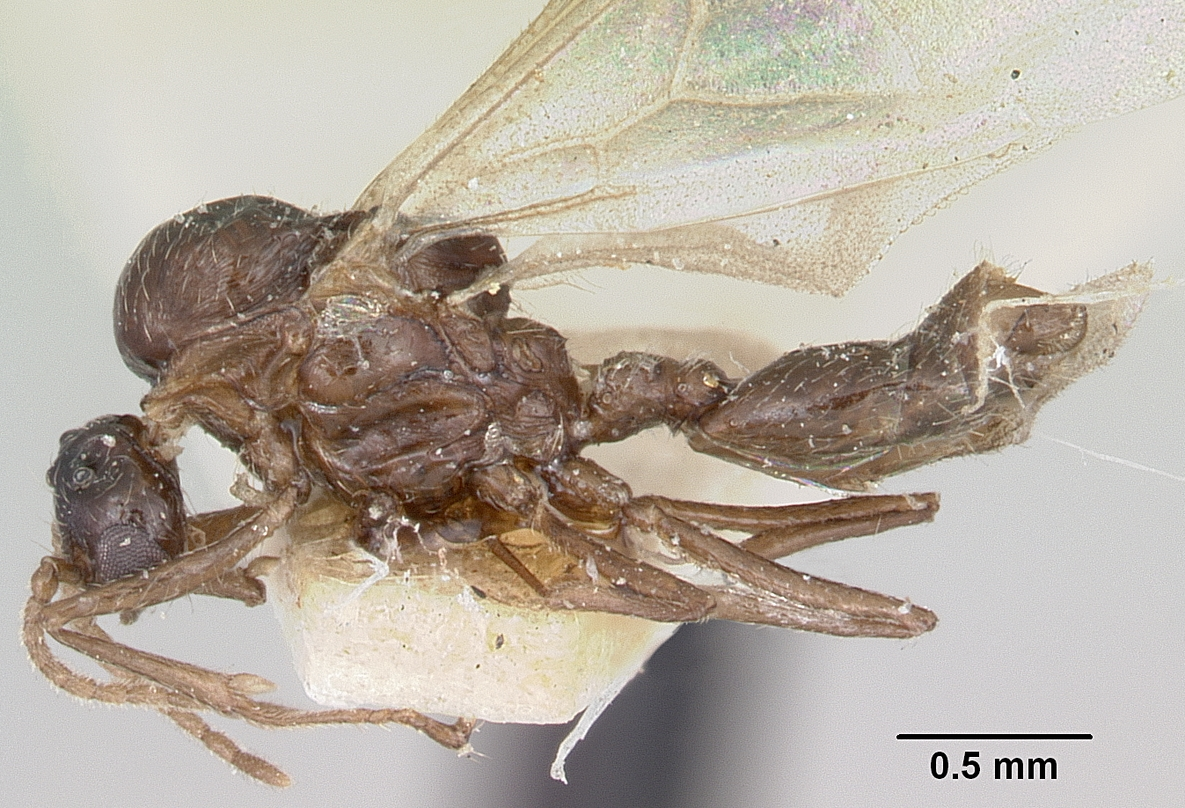
Male caste of C. degeeri

More than 520 species are recognised in the genus Crematogaster:

- Crematogaster abdominalis Motschoulsky, 1863
- Crematogaster aberrans Forel, 1892
- Crematogaster abouzeidi Sharaf, 2024
- Crematogaster abrupta Mann, 1919
- Crematogaster abstinens Forel, 1899
- Crematogaster acaciae Forel, 1892
- Crematogaster aculeata Donisthorpe, 1941
- Crematogaster acuta Fabricius, 1804
- Crematogaster aegyptiaca Mayr, 1862
- Crematogaster afghanica Forel, 1967
- Crematogaster africana Mayr, 1895
- Crematogaster agnetis Forel, 1892
- Crematogaster agniae Karavaiev, 1935
- Crematogaster alafara Blaimer, 2013
- Crematogaster algirica Lucas, 1849
- Crematogaster alluaudi Emery, 1893
- Crematogaster aloysiisabaudiae Menozzi, 1930
- Crematogaster alulai Emery, 1901
- Crematogaster amabilis Santschi, 1911
- Crematogaster amapaensis Kempf, 1960
- Crematogaster ambigua Santschi, 1926
- Crematogaster amita Forel, 1913
- Crematogaster ampla Powell, 2014
- Crematogaster ampullaris Smith, 1861
- Crematogaster ancipitula Forel, 1917
- Crematogaster angulosa Andre, 1896
- Crematogaster angusticeps Santschi, 1911
- Crematogaster antaris Forel, 1894
- Crematogaster anthracina Smith, 1857
- Crematogaster apicalis Motschoulsky, 1878
- Crematogaster arata Emery, 1906
- Crematogaster arcuata Forel, 1899
- Crematogaster arnoldi Forel, 1914
- Crematogaster aroensis Menozzi, 1935
- Crematogaster arthurimuelleri Forel, 1894
- Crematogaster ashmeadi Mayr, 1886
- Crematogaster atra Mayr, 1870
- Crematogaster auberti Emery, 1869
- Crematogaster augusti Emery, 1895
- Crematogaster aurita Karavaiev, 1935
- Crematogaster australis Mayr, 1876
- Crematogaster baduvi Forel, 1912
- Crematogaster bakeri Menozzi, 1925
- Crematogaster bandarensis Forel, 1913
- Crematogaster bara Blaimer, 2013
- Crematogaster batesi Forel, 1911
- Crematogaster bequaerti Forel, 1913
- Crematogaster betapicalis Smith, 1995
- Crematogaster bicolor Smith, 1860
- Crematogaster biformis Andre, 1892
- Crematogaster binghamii Forel, 1904
- Crematogaster bingo Forel, 1908
- Crematogaster bipartita Emery, 1922
- Crematogaster biroi Mayr, 1897
- Crematogaster bison Forel, 1913
- Crematogaster boera Ruzsky, 1926
- Crematogaster bogojawlenskii Ruzsky, 1905
- Crematogaster boliviana Wheeler, 1922
- Crematogaster bonnieae Akbar et al., 2023
- Crematogaster borneensis Andre, 1896
- Crematogaster bouvardi Santschi, 1920
- Crematogaster brasiliensis Mayr, 1878
- Crematogaster brevidentata Forel, 1912
- Crematogaster brevimandibularis Donisthorpe, 1943
- Crematogaster brevis Emery, 1887
- Crematogaster brevispina Hosoishi & Ogata, 2016
- Crematogaster breviventris Santschi, 1920
- Crematogaster browni Buren, 1968
- Crematogaster bruchi Forel, 1912
- Crematogaster brunensis Hosoishi & Ogata, 2016
- Crematogaster brunnea Smith, 1857
- Crematogaster brunneipennis Andre, 1890
- Crematogaster brunnescens Motschoulsky, 1863
- Crematogaster bryophilia Longino, 2003
- Crematogaster buchneri Forel, 1894
- Crematogaster buddhae Forel, 1902
- Crematogaster butteli Forel, 1913
- Crematogaster californica Wheeler, 1919
- Crematogaster capensis Mayr, 1862
- Crematogaster captiosa Forel, 1911
- Crematogaster carinata Mayr, 1862
- Crematogaster castanea Smith, 1858
- Crematogaster cedrosensis Wheeler, 1934
- Crematogaster celebensis Hosoishi & Ogata, 2016
- Crematogaster censor Forel, 1910
- Crematogaster cephalotes Smith, 1857
- Crematogaster cerasi Fitch, 1855
- Crematogaster chhangi Hosoishi & Ogata, 2014
- Crematogaster chiarinii Emery, 1881
- Crematogaster chlorotica Emery, 1899
- Crematogaster chodati Forel, 1921
- Crematogaster chopardi Bernard, 1950
- Crematogaster chungi Brown, 1949
- Crematogaster cicatriculosa Roger, 1863
- Crematogaster cisplatinalis Mayr, 1887
- Crematogaster clarior Forel, 1902
- Crematogaster clariventris Mayr, 1895
- Crematogaster claudiae Feldhaar et al., 2016
- Crematogaster clydia Forel, 1912
- Crematogaster coarctata Mayr, 1870
- Crematogaster coelestis Santschi, 1911
- Crematogaster colei Buren, 1968
- Crematogaster concava Emery, 1899
- Crematogaster consternens (Walker, 1859)
- Crematogaster constructor Emery, 1895
- Crematogaster contemta Mayr, 1879
- Crematogaster coriaria Mayr, 1872
- Crematogaster cornigera Forel, 1902
- Crematogaster cornuta Crawley, 1924
- Crematogaster corporaali Santschi, 1928
- Crematogaster corticicola Mayr, 1887
- Crematogaster corvina Mayr, 1870
- Crematogaster crassicornis Emery, 1893
- Crematogaster crinosa Mayr, 1862
- Crematogaster cristata Santschi, 1929
- Crematogaster crucis Forel, 1912
- Crematogaster cubaensis Mann, 1920
- Crematogaster curvispinosa Mayr, 1862
- Crematogaster cuvierae Donisthorpe, 1945
- Crematogaster cylindriceps Wheeler, 1927
- Crematogaster cypria Santschi, 1930
- Crematogaster dahlii Forel, 1901
- Crematogaster daisyi Forel, 1901
- Crematogaster dalyi Forel, 1902
- Crematogaster decamera Forel, 1910
- Crematogaster degeeri Forel, 1886
- Crematogaster delagoensis Forel, 1894
- Crematogaster delitescens Wheeler, 1921
- Crematogaster dentata Dalla Torre, 1893
- Crematogaster dentinodis Forel, 1901
- Crematogaster depilis Wheeler, 1919
- Crematogaster depressa (Latreille, 1802)
- Crematogaster desecta Forel, 1911
- Crematogaster desperans Forel, 1914
- Crematogaster detecta Ward & Blaimer, 2022
- Crematogaster dhofarensis Sharaf, 2025
- Crematogaster difformis Smith, 1857
- Crematogaster diffusa (Jerdon, 1851)
- Crematogaster discinodis Emery, 1893
- Crematogaster distans Mayr, 1870
- Crematogaster dohrni Mayr, 1879
- Crematogaster dolens Forel, 1910
- Crematogaster donisthorpei Santschi, 1934
- Crematogaster dorada Fiorentino et al., 2025
- Crematogaster dorsidens Santschi, 1925
- Crematogaster dubia Karavaiev, 1935
- Crematogaster ebenina Forel, 1902
- Crematogaster edentula Santschi, 1914
- Crematogaster egidyi Forel, 1903
- Crematogaster egregior Forel, 1912
- Crematogaster elegans Smith, 1859
- Crematogaster elysii Mann, 1919
- Crematogaster emeryana Creighton, 1950
- Crematogaster emeryi Forel, 1907
- Crematogaster enneamera Emery, 1900
- Crematogaster ensifera Forel, 1910
- Crematogaster erecta Mayr, 1866
- Crematogaster erectepilosa Salata & Borowiec, 2015
- Crematogaster eurydice Forel, 1915
- Crematogaster euterpe Santschi, 1922
- Crematogaster evallans Forel, 1907
- Crematogaster excisa Mayr, 1895
- Crematogaster ferrarii Emery, 1888
- Crematogaster flava Forel, 1886
- Crematogaster flavicornis Emery, 1897
- Crematogaster flavitarsis Emery, 1900
- Crematogaster flaviventris Santschi, 1910
- Crematogaster flavomicrops Longino, 2003
- Crematogaster flavosensitiva Longino, 2003
- Crematogaster foliocrypta Longino, 2003
- Crematogaster foraminiceps Santschi, 1913
- Crematogaster formosa Mayr, 1870
- Crematogaster foxi Mann, 1919
- Crematogaster fraxatrix Forel, 1911
- Crematogaster fritzi Emery, 1901
- Crematogaster frivola Forel, 1902
- Crematogaster fruhstorferi Emery, 1901
- Crematogaster fuentei Menozzi, 1922
- Crematogaster fumikoae Hosoishi & Ogata, 2015
- Crematogaster fusca Mayr, 1876
- Crematogaster gabonensis Emery, 1899
- Crematogaster gadagkari Dhadwal & Bharti, 2024
- Crematogaster gallicola Forel, 1894
- Crematogaster gambiensis Andre, 1889
- Crematogaster gavapiga Menozzi, 1935
- Crematogaster gerstaeckeri Dalla Torre, 1892
- Crematogaster ghoneimi Sharaf & Aldawood, 2022
- Crematogaster goeldii Forel, 1903
- Crematogaster gordani Karaman, M., 2008
- Crematogaster gratiosa Santschi, 1926
- Crematogaster grevei Forel, 1891
- Crematogaster gryllsi Sharaf & Hita Garcia, 2019
- Crematogaster gullukdagensis Salata & Borowiec, 2015
- Crematogaster gutenbergi Santschi, 1914
- Crematogaster gypsophila Mohseni, 2023
- Crematogaster hafahafa Blaimer, 2013
- Crematogaster hashimi Hosoishi, 2015
- Crematogaster hazolava Blaimer, 2013
- Crematogaster heathi Mann, 1916
- Crematogaster hemiceros Santschi, 1926
- Crematogaster hespera Buren, 1968
- Crematogaster hezaradjatica Pisarski, 1967
- Crematogaster himalayana Forel, 1902
- Crematogaster hodgsoni Forel, 1902
- Crematogaster homeri Forel, 1913
- Crematogaster hottentota Emery, 1899
- Crematogaster hova Forel, 1887
- Crematogaster huberi Forel, 1907
- Crematogaster hullettii Feldhaar et al., 2016
- Crematogaster iheringi Forel, 1908
- Crematogaster ilgii Forel, 1910
- Crematogaster imperfecta Hosoishi, 2015
- Crematogaster impressa Emery, 1899
- Crematogaster impressiceps Mayr, 1902
- Crematogaster inconspicua Mayr, 1896
- Crematogaster incorrecta Santschi, 1917
- Crematogaster indefensa Kempf, 1968
- Crematogaster indosinensis Hosoishi & Ogata, 2016
- Crematogaster inermis Mayr, 1862
- Crematogaster inflata Smith, 1857
- Crematogaster innocens Forel, 1911
- Crematogaster insularis Smith, 1859
- Crematogaster ionia Forel, 1911
- Crematogaster iridipennis Smith, 1865
- Crematogaster irritabilis Smith, 1860
- Crematogaster isolata Buren, 1968
- Crematogaster izanami Terayama, 2013
- Crematogaster jacindae Sharaf & Hita Garcia, 2019
- Crematogaster jacobsoni Forel, 1911
- Crematogaster jardinero Longino, 2003
- Crematogaster javanica Menozzi, 1935
- Crematogaster jeanneli Santschi, 1914
- Crematogaster jehovae Forel, 1907
- Crematogaster jullieni Santschi, 1910
- Crematogaster juventa Santschi, 1926
- Crematogaster kachelibae Arnold, 1954
- Crematogaster karawaiewi Menozzi, 1935
- Crematogaster kasaiensis Forel, 1913
- Crematogaster kelleri Forel, 1891
- Crematogaster keris Hosoishi, 2020
- Crematogaster khmerensis Hosoishi & Ogata, 2017
- Crematogaster kirbii (Sykes, 1835)
- Crematogaster kneri Mayr, 1862
- Crematogaster kohli Forel, 1909
- Crematogaster kojimai Hosoishi & Ogata, 2012
- Crematogaster kutteri Viehmeyer, 1924
- Crematogaster laestrygon Emery, 1869
- Crematogaster laeviceps Smith, 1858
- Crematogaster laevis Mayr, 1878
- Crematogaster laevissima Smith, 1860
- Crematogaster laeviuscula Mayr, 1870
- Crematogaster lamottei Bernard, 1953
- Crematogaster lango Weber, 1943
- Crematogaster larreae Buren, 1968
- Crematogaster latipetiolata Karavaiev, 1935
- Crematogaster latuka Weber, 1943
- Crematogaster laurenti Forel, 1909
- Crematogaster ledouxi Soulie, 1961
- Crematogaster levior Longino, 2003
- Crematogaster libengensis Stitz, 1916
- Crematogaster liengmei Forel, 1894
- Crematogaster limata Smith, 1858
- Crematogaster lineolata (Say, 1836)
- Crematogaster linsenmairi Feldhaar et al., 2016
- Crematogaster litoralis Arnold, 1955
- Crematogaster lobata Emery, 1895
- Crematogaster longicephala Özdikmen, 2010
- Crematogaster longiceps Forel, 1910
- Crematogaster longiclava Emery, 1893
- Crematogaster longipilosa Forel, 1907
- Crematogaster longispina Emery, 1890
- Crematogaster lorteti Forel, 1910
- Crematogaster lotti Weber, 1943
- Crematogaster lucayana Wheeler, 1905
- Crematogaster luctans Forel, 1907
- Crematogaster lutzi Forel, 1905
- Crematogaster luzonensis Hosoishi & Ogata, 2016
- Crematogaster macaoensis Wu & Wang, 1995
- Crematogaster macracantha Creighton, 1945
- Crematogaster madagascariensis Andre, 1887
- Crematogaster madecassa Emery, 1895
- Crematogaster mafybe Blaimer, 2013
- Crematogaster magitae Forel, 1910
- Crematogaster magnifica Santschi, 1925
- Crematogaster mahery Blaimer, 2010
- Crematogaster maina Blaimer, 2013
- Crematogaster major Donisthorpe, 1941
- Crematogaster malahelo Blaimer, 2013
- Crematogaster malala Blaimer, 2010
- Crematogaster mancocapaci Santschi, 1911
- Crematogaster manni Buren, 1968
- Crematogaster margaritae Emery, 1895
- Crematogaster marioni Buren, 1968
- Crematogaster marthae Forel, 1892
- Crematogaster maryatii Feldhaar et al., 2016
- Crematogaster masokely Blaimer, 2013
- Crematogaster masukoi Hosoishi et al., 2010
- Crematogaster matsumurai Forel, 1901
- Crematogaster meijerei Emery, 1911
- Crematogaster melanogaster Emery, 1895
- Crematogaster menilekii Forel, 1894
- Crematogaster mesonotalis Emery, 1911
- Crematogaster microspina Menozzi, 1942
- Crematogaster mimosae Santschi, 1914
- Crematogaster minutissima Mayr, 1870
- Crematogaster misella Arnold, 1920
- Crematogaster missouriensis Emery, 1895
- Crematogaster mjobergi Forel, 1915
- Crematogaster moatensis Hosoishi & Ogata, 2016
- Crematogaster modiglianii Emery, 1900
- Crematogaster moelleri Forel, 1912
- Crematogaster monocula Hosoishi, 2019
- Crematogaster montana Borgmeier, 1939
- Crematogaster montenigrina Karaman, M., 2008
- Crematogaster monteverdensis Longino, 2003
- Crematogaster montezumia Smith, 1858
- Crematogaster monticola Arnold, 1920
- Crematogaster moqorensis Pisarski, 1967
- Crematogaster mosis Forel, 1909
- Crematogaster mottazi Santschi, 1928
- Crematogaster mpanjono Blaimer, 2012
- Crematogaster mucronata Emery, 1900
- Crematogaster muralti Forel, 1910
- Crematogaster mutans Buren, 1968
- Crematogaster myops Forel, 1911
- Crematogaster natalensis Forel, 1910
- Crematogaster navajoa Buren, 1968
- Crematogaster nawai Ito, 1914
- Crematogaster nesiotis Mann, 1919
- Crematogaster neuvillei Forel, 1907
- Crematogaster nigeriensis Santschi, 1914
- Crematogaster nigrans Forel, 1915
- Crematogaster nigriceps Emery, 1897
- Crematogaster nigronitens Santschi, 1917
- Crematogaster nigropilosa Mayr, 1870
- Crematogaster nitidiceps Emery, 1895
- Crematogaster nocturna Buren, 1968
- Crematogaster nosibeensis Forel, 1891
- Crematogaster oasium Santschi, 1911
- Crematogaster obnigra Mann, 1919
- Crematogaster obscura Smith, 1857
- Crematogaster obscurata Emery, 1895
- Crematogaster ocellata Hosoishi & Ogata, 2016
- Crematogaster ochracea Mayr, 1862
- Crematogaster ochraceiventris Stitz, 1916
- Crematogaster ogatai Hosoishi, 2022
- Crematogaster onusta Stitz, 1925
- Crematogaster opaca Mayr, 1870
- Crematogaster opaciceps Mayr, 1901
- Crematogaster opuntiae Buren, 1968
- Crematogaster orobia Santschi, 1919
- Crematogaster osakensis Forel, 1900
- Crematogaster oscaris Forel, 1910
- Crematogaster ourea Salata et al., 2024
- Crematogaster overbecki Viehmeyer, 1916
- Crematogaster oxygynoides Santschi, 1934
- Crematogaster painei Donisthorpe, 1945
- Crematogaster pallida Lowne, 1865
- Crematogaster pallipes Mayr, 1862
- Crematogaster paolii Menozzi, 1930
- Crematogaster paradoxa Emery, 1894
- Crematogaster parallela Santschi, 1925
- Crematogaster parapilosa Ward & Blaimer, 2022
- Crematogaster patei Buren, 1968
- Crematogaster pauciseta Emery, 1899
- Crematogaster pauli Emery, 1901
- Crematogaster pellens Walker, 1859
- Crematogaster perelegans Forel, 1902
- Crematogaster peringueyi Emery, 1895
- Crematogaster peristerica Menozzi, 1925
- Crematogaster peruviana (Wheeler, 1922)
- Crematogaster petiolidens Forel, 1916
- Crematogaster pfeifferi Hosoishi & Ogata, 2017
- Crematogaster philippinensis Hosoishi & Ogata, 2016
- Crematogaster phoenica Santschi, 1915
- Crematogaster phoenix Santschi, 1921
- Crematogaster physothorax Emery, 1889
- Crematogaster pia Forel, 1911
- Crematogaster pilosa Emery, 1895
- Crematogaster pinicola Deyrup, 2007
- Crematogaster polita Smith, 1865
- Crematogaster politula Forel, 1902
- Crematogaster polymnia Santschi, 1922
- Crematogaster popohana Forel, 1912
- Crematogaster pradipi Tiwari, 1999
- Crematogaster pseudinermis Viehmeyer, 1923
- Crematogaster pulchella Bernard, 1953
- Crematogaster punctulata Emery, 1895
- Crematogaster pygmaea Forel, 1904
- Crematogaster quadriformis Roger, 1863
- Crematogaster quadriruga Forel, 1911
- Crematogaster quadrispinosa Roger, 1863
- Crematogaster queenslandica Forel, 1902
- Crematogaster ralumensis Forel, 1901
- Crematogaster ramamy Blaimer, 2013
- Crematogaster ramicola Hosoishi & Yamane, 2026
- Crematogaster ranavalonae Forel, 1887
- Crematogaster ransonneti Mayr, 1868
- Crematogaster raptor Longino, 2003
- Crematogaster rasoherinae Forel, 1891
- Crematogaster rauana Forel, 1907
- Crematogaster razana Blaimer, 2012
- Crematogaster rectinota Forel, 1913
- Crematogaster recurva Emery, 1897
- Crematogaster resulcata Bolton, 1995
- Crematogaster reticulata Hosoishi, 2009
- Crematogaster retifera Santschi, 1926
- Crematogaster rifelna Buren, 1968
- Crematogaster rivai Emery, 1897
- Crematogaster rochai Forel, 1903
- Crematogaster rogenhoferi Mayr, 1879
- Crematogaster rogeri Emery, 1922
- Crematogaster ronganensis Zhou, 2001
- Crematogaster roslihashimi Feldhaar et al., 2016
- Crematogaster rossi Buren, 1968
- Crematogaster rothneyi Mayr, 1879
- Crematogaster rudis Emery, 1894
- Crematogaster rufa (Jerdon, 1851)
- Crematogaster rufigena Arnold, 1958
- Crematogaster rufotestacea Mayr, 1876
- Crematogaster rugosa Andre, 1895
- Crematogaster rugosior Santschi, 1910
- Crematogaster ruspolii Forel, 1892
- Crematogaster russata Wheeler, 1925
- Crematogaster russoi Menozzi, 1930
- Crematogaster rustica Santschi, 1935
- Crematogaster sabatra Blaimer, 2010
- Crematogaster sagei Forel, 1902
- Crematogaster sanguinea Roger, 1863
- Crematogaster santschii Forel, 1913
- Crematogaster saussurei Forel, 1899
- Crematogaster scapamaris Santschi, 1922
- Crematogaster scelerata Santschi, 1917
- Crematogaster schencki Forel, 1891
- Crematogaster schimmeri Forel, 1912
- Crematogaster schmidti (Mayr, 1853)
- Crematogaster schultzei Forel, 1910
- Crematogaster scita Forel, 1902
- Crematogaster scutellaris (Olivier, 1792)
- Crematogaster semperi Emery, 1893
- Crematogaster senegalensis Roger, 1863
- Crematogaster sericea Forel, 1912
- Crematogaster sewardi Forel, 1901
- Crematogaster sewellii Forel, 1891
- Crematogaster sikkimensis Forel, 1904
- Crematogaster simboloni Hosoishi & Ogata, 2014
- Crematogaster similis Stitz, 1911
- Crematogaster simoni Emery, 1893
- Crematogaster sisa Blaimer, 2010
- Crematogaster sjostedti (Mayr, 1907)
- Crematogaster skounensis Soulie, 1961
- Crematogaster snellingi Longino, 2003
- Crematogaster solenopsides Emery, 1899
- Crematogaster solers Forel, 1910
- Crematogaster sordidula (Nylander, 1849)
- Crematogaster sorokini Ruzsky, 1905
- Crematogaster sotobosque Longino, 2003
- Crematogaster stadelmanni Mayr, 1895
- Crematogaster steinheili Forel, 1881
- Crematogaster stenocephala Emery, 1922
- Crematogaster stigmata Santschi, 1914
- Crematogaster stigmatica Forel, 1911
- Crematogaster stollii Forel, 1885
- Crematogaster storki Hosoishi & Ogata, 2016
- Crematogaster striaticeps Forel, 1909
- Crematogaster striatula Emery, 1892
- Crematogaster subcircularis Mayr, 1879
- Crematogaster subdentata Mayr, 1877
- Crematogaster subnuda Mayr, 1879
- Crematogaster subtonsa Santschi, 1925
- Crematogaster suehiro Terayama, 1999
- Crematogaster sumichrasti Mayr, 1870
- Crematogaster sundalandensis Hosoishi & Ogata, 2016
- Crematogaster tanakai Hosoishi & Ogata, 2009
- Crematogaster tarsata Smith, 1865
- Crematogaster tavaratra Blaimer, 2013
- Crematogaster telolafy Blaimer, 2012
- Crematogaster tenuicula Forel, 1904
- Crematogaster tenuipilis Santschi, 1937
- Crematogaster teranishii Santschi, 1930
- Crematogaster terminalis (Shuckard, 1838)
- Crematogaster tetracantha Emery, 1887
- Crematogaster thalia Forel, 1911
- Crematogaster theta Forel, 1911
- Crematogaster togoensis Donisthorpe, 1945
- Crematogaster torosa Mayr, 1870
- Crematogaster transiens Forel, 1913
- Crematogaster transvaalensis Forel, 1894
- Crematogaster trautweini Viehmeyer, 1914
- Crematogaster travancorensis Forel, 1902
- Crematogaster treubi Emery, 1896
- Crematogaster tricolor Gerstäcker, 1859
- Crematogaster tsisitsilo Blaimer, 2013
- Crematogaster tumidula Emery, 1900
- Crematogaster udo Forel, 1905
- Crematogaster unciata Santschi, 1925
- Crematogaster uruguayensis Santschi, 1912
- Crematogaster ustiventris Menozzi, 1935
- Crematogaster vacca Forel, 1911
- Crematogaster vagula Wheeler, 1928
- Crematogaster vandeli Soulie, 1961
- Crematogaster vandermeermohri Menozzi, 1930
- Crematogaster vermiculata Emery, 1895
- Crematogaster vetusta Ward & Blaimer, 2022
- Crematogaster vicina André, 1893
- Crematogaster victima Smith, 1858
- Crematogaster vidua Santschi, 1928
- Crematogaster vieti Hosoishi & Ogata, 20168
- Crematogaster vitalisi Menozzi, 1925
- Crematogaster volamena Blaimer, 2012
- Crematogaster vulcania Santschi, 1913
- Crematogaster walshi Forel, 1902
- Crematogaster warburgi Menozzi, 1933
- Crematogaster wardi Longino, 2003
- Crematogaster wasmanni Santschi, 1910
- Crematogaster weberi Emery, 1911
- Crematogaster wellmani Forel, 1909
- Crematogaster werneri Mayr, 1907
- Crematogaster wheeleri Mann, 1919
- Crematogaster whitei Wheeler, 1915
- Crematogaster wilwerthi Santschi, 1910
- Crematogaster wroughtonii Forel, 1902
- Crematogaster xerophila Wheeler, 1915
- Crematogaster yaharai Hosoishi & Ogata, 2019
- Crematogaster yamanei Hosoishi & Ogata, 2009
- Crematogaster yappi Forel, 1901
- Crematogaster zavattarii Menozzi, 1926
- Crematogaster zoceensis Santschi, 1925
- Crematogaster zonacaciae Weber, 1943
- Crematogaster zumpti Taylor et al., 2018

== See also ==
- Euryplatea nanaknihali
