= Crematogaster angulosa =

Scientific classification
- Domain: Eukaryota
- Kingdom: Animalia
- Phylum: Arthropoda
- Class: Insecta
- Order: Hymenoptera
- Family: Formicidae
- Subfamily: Myrmicinae
- Genus: Crematogaster
- Species: C. angulosa

Binomial name
- Crematogaster angulosa Andre, 1896

Species of ant

Crematogaster angulosa is a species of ant in tribe Crematogastrini. It was described by Andre in 1896.
