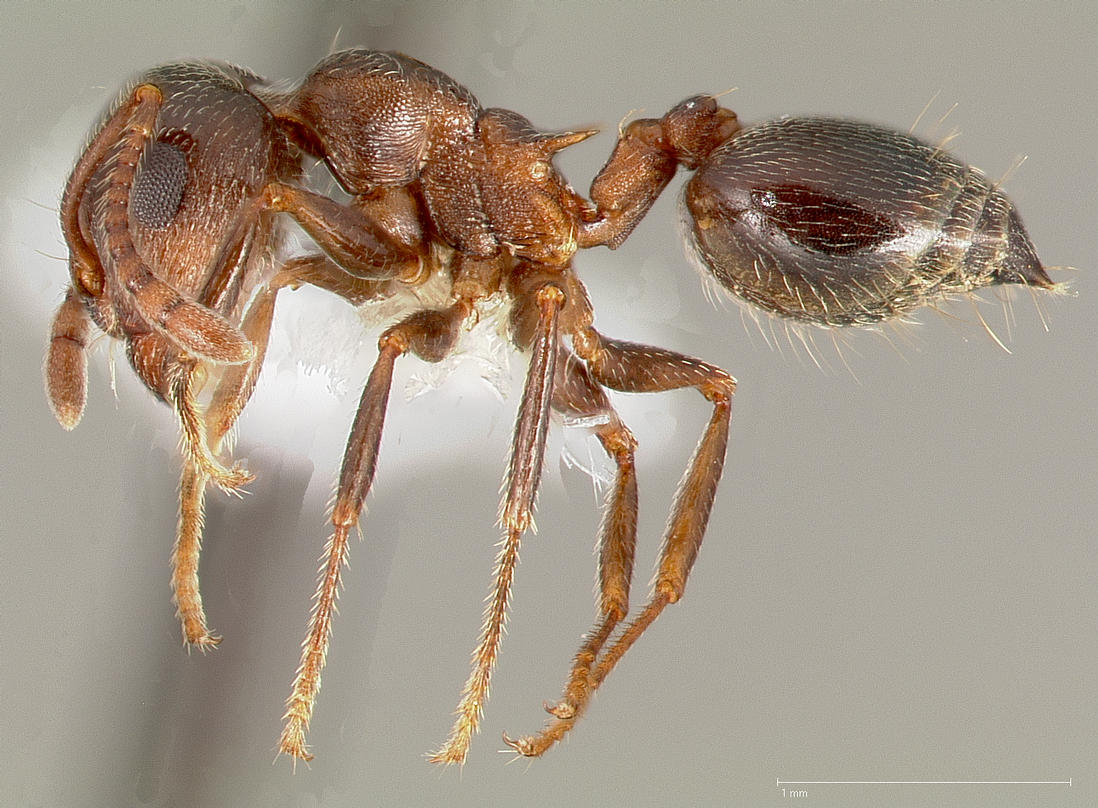

Scientific classification
- Domain: Eukaryota
- Kingdom: Animalia
- Phylum: Arthropoda
- Class: Insecta
- Order: Hymenoptera
- Family: Formicidae
- Subfamily: Myrmicinae
- Genus: Crematogaster
- Species: C. californica

Binomial name
- Crematogaster californica Wheeler, 1919

= Crematogaster californica =

Species of ant

Crematogaster californica is a species of ant in tribe Crematogastrini. It was described by Wheeler in 1919.
