= Crematogaster alluaudi =

Scientific classification
- Kingdom: Animalia
- Phylum: Arthropoda
- Clade: Pancrustacea
- Class: Insecta
- Order: Hymenoptera
- Family: Formicidae
- Subfamily: Myrmicinae
- Genus: Crematogaster
- Species: C. alluaudi

Binomial name
- Crematogaster alluaudi Emery, 1893

Species of ant

Crematogaster alluaudi is a species of ant in tribe Crematogastrini. It was described by Emery in 1893. The species is endemic to the Canary Islands, where it is found on four of the seven islands of the archipelago: El Hierro, La Palma, La Gomera, and Tenerife.
