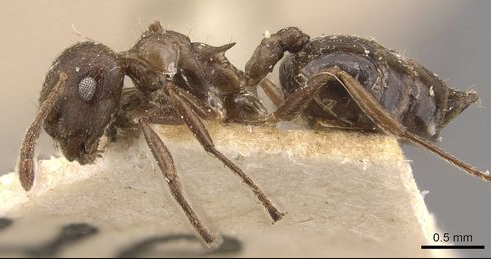
- A profile view of Crematogaster desecta

Scientific classification
- Domain: Eukaryota
- Kingdom: Animalia
- Phylum: Arthropoda
- Class: Insecta
- Order: Hymenoptera
- Family: Formicidae
- Subfamily: Myrmicinae
- Genus: Crematogaster
- Species: C. desecta

Binomial name
- Crematogaster desecta Forel, 1911

= Crematogaster desecta =

Species of ant

Crematogaster desecta is a species of ant of the subfamily Myrmicinae which can be found in Sri Lanka.
