= Crematogaster aroensis =

Scientific classification
- Domain: Eukaryota
- Kingdom: Animalia
- Phylum: Arthropoda
- Class: Insecta
- Order: Hymenoptera
- Family: Formicidae
- Subfamily: Myrmicinae
- Genus: Crematogaster
- Species: C. aroensis

Binomial name
- Crematogaster aroensis Menozzi, 1935

Species of ant

Crematogaster aroensis is a species of ant in tribe Crematogastrini. It was described by Menozzi in 1935.
