= Crematogaster boera =

Scientific classification
- Domain: Eukaryota
- Kingdom: Animalia
- Phylum: Arthropoda
- Class: Insecta
- Order: Hymenoptera
- Family: Formicidae
- Subfamily: Myrmicinae
- Genus: Crematogaster
- Species: C. boera

Binomial name
- Crematogaster boera Ruzsky, 1926

Species of ant

Crematogaster boera is a species of ant in tribe Crematogastrini. It was described by Ruzsky in 1926.
