= Crematogaster elegans =

Scientific classification
- Domain: Eukaryota
- Kingdom: Animalia
- Phylum: Arthropoda
- Class: Insecta
- Order: Hymenoptera
- Family: Formicidae
- Subfamily: Myrmicinae
- Genus: Crematogaster
- Species: C. elegans

Binomial name
- Crematogaster elegans Smith, 1859

Species of ant

Crematogaster elegans is a species of ant in the genus Crematogaster.
