= Crematogaster chungi =

Scientific classification
- Domain: Eukaryota
- Kingdom: Animalia
- Phylum: Arthropoda
- Class: Insecta
- Order: Hymenoptera
- Family: Formicidae
- Subfamily: Myrmicinae
- Genus: Crematogaster
- Species: C. chungi

Binomial name
- Crematogaster chungi Brown, 1949

Species of ant

Crematogaster chungi is a species of ant in tribe Crematogastrini. It was described by William Louis Brown Jr. in 1949.
