= Crematogaster ampullaris =

Scientific classification
- Domain: Eukaryota
- Kingdom: Animalia
- Phylum: Arthropoda
- Class: Insecta
- Order: Hymenoptera
- Family: Formicidae
- Subfamily: Myrmicinae
- Genus: Crematogaster
- Species: C. ampullaris

Binomial name
- Crematogaster ampullaris Smith, 1861

Species of ant

Crematogaster ampullaris is a species of ant in the tribe Crematogastrini. It was described by Smith in 1861. They are active during the daytime as they are diurnal.

Crematogaster ampullaris has been found in dry forest habitats in Indonesia, Malaysia, and Vietnam.
