= Crematogaster bingo =

Scientific classification
- Domain: Eukaryota
- Kingdom: Animalia
- Phylum: Arthropoda
- Class: Insecta
- Order: Hymenoptera
- Family: Formicidae
- Subfamily: Myrmicinae
- Genus: Crematogaster
- Species: C. bingo

Binomial name
- Crematogaster bingo Forel, 1908

Species of ant

Crematogaster bingo is a species of ant in tribe Crematogastrini. It was described by Forel in 1908.
