= Crematogaster cicatriculosa =

Scientific classification
- Domain: Eukaryota
- Kingdom: Animalia
- Phylum: Arthropoda
- Class: Insecta
- Order: Hymenoptera
- Family: Formicidae
- Subfamily: Myrmicinae
- Genus: Crematogaster
- Species: C. cicatriculosa

Binomial name
- Crematogaster cicatriculosa Roger, 1863

Species of ant

Crematogaster cicatriculosa is a species of ant in tribe Crematogastrini. It was described by Roger in 1863.
