= Crematogaster bakeri =

Scientific classification
- Domain: Eukaryota
- Kingdom: Animalia
- Phylum: Arthropoda
- Class: Insecta
- Order: Hymenoptera
- Family: Formicidae
- Subfamily: Myrmicinae
- Genus: Crematogaster
- Species: C. bakeri

Binomial name
- Crematogaster bakeri Menozzi, 1925

Species of ant

Crematogaster bakeri is a species of ant in tribe Crematogastrini. It was described by Menozzi in 1925.
