= Crematogaster amita =

Scientific classification
- Domain: Eukaryota
- Kingdom: Animalia
- Phylum: Arthropoda
- Class: Insecta
- Order: Hymenoptera
- Family: Formicidae
- Subfamily: Myrmicinae
- Genus: Crematogaster
- Species: C. amita

Binomial name
- Crematogaster amita Forel, 1913

Species of ant

Crematogaster amita is a species of ant in tribe Crematogastrini. It was described by Forel in 1913.
