= Crematogaster tanakai =

Scientific classification
- Kingdom: Animalia
- Phylum: Arthropoda
- Class: Insecta
- Order: Hymenoptera
- Family: Formicidae
- Subfamily: Myrmicinae
- Genus: Crematogaster
- Species: C. tanakai

Binomial name
- Crematogaster tanakai Hosoishi, S. & Ogata, K., 2009

Species of ant

Crematogaster tanakai species of ant in the subfamily Myrmicinae.
