= Crematogaster chopardi =

Scientific classification
- Domain: Eukaryota
- Kingdom: Animalia
- Phylum: Arthropoda
- Class: Insecta
- Order: Hymenoptera
- Family: Formicidae
- Subfamily: Myrmicinae
- Genus: Crematogaster
- Species: C. chopardi

Binomial name
- Crematogaster chopardi Bernard, 1950

Species of ant

Crematogaster chopardi is a species of ant in tribe Crematogastrini. It was described by Bernard in 1950.
