= Crematogaster cephalotes =

Scientific classification
- Domain: Eukaryota
- Kingdom: Animalia
- Phylum: Arthropoda
- Class: Insecta
- Order: Hymenoptera
- Family: Formicidae
- Subfamily: Myrmicinae
- Genus: Crematogaster
- Species: C. cephalotes

Binomial name
- Crematogaster cephalotes Smith, 1857

Species of ant

Crematogaster cephalotes is a species of ant in tribe Crematogastrini. It was described by Smith in 1857.
