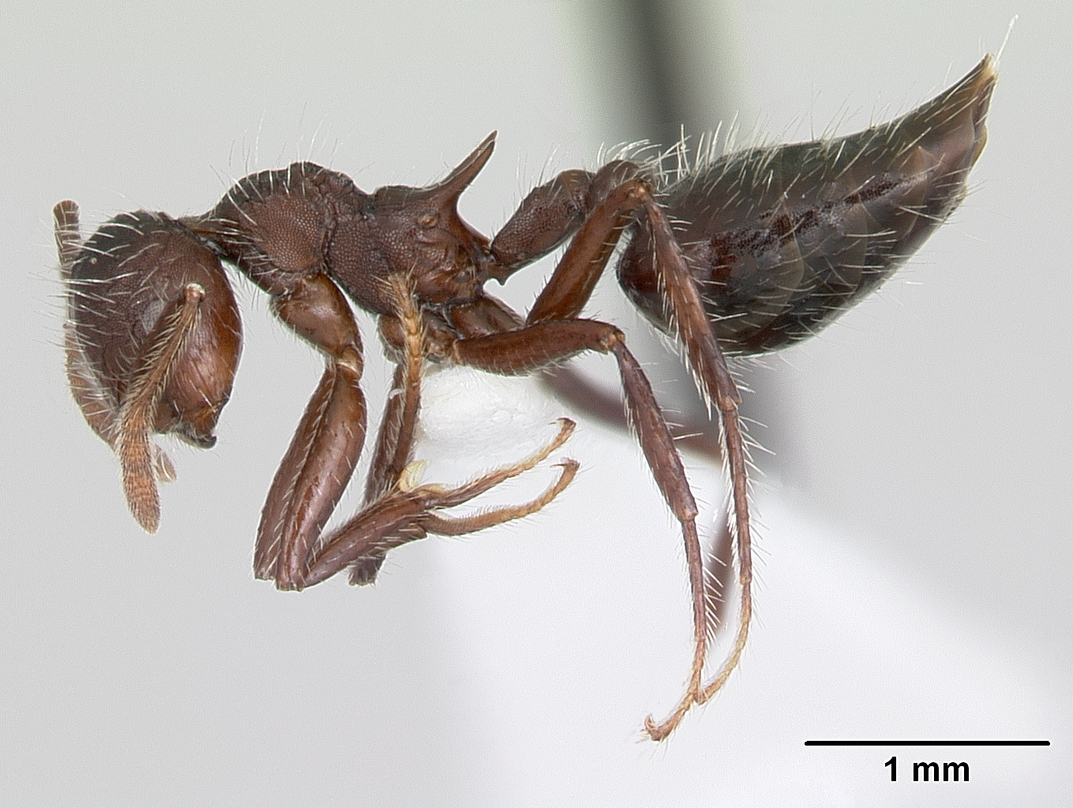
- Crematogaster acuta

Scientific classification
- Domain: Eukaryota
- Kingdom: Animalia
- Phylum: Arthropoda
- Class: Insecta
- Order: Hymenoptera
- Family: Formicidae
- Subfamily: Myrmicinae
- Genus: Crematogaster
- Species: C. acuta

Binomial name
- Crematogaster acuta Fabricius, 1804

= Crematogaster acuta =

Species of ant

Crematogaster acuta is a species of ant in tribe Crematogastrini. It was described by Johan Christian Fabricius in 1804.
