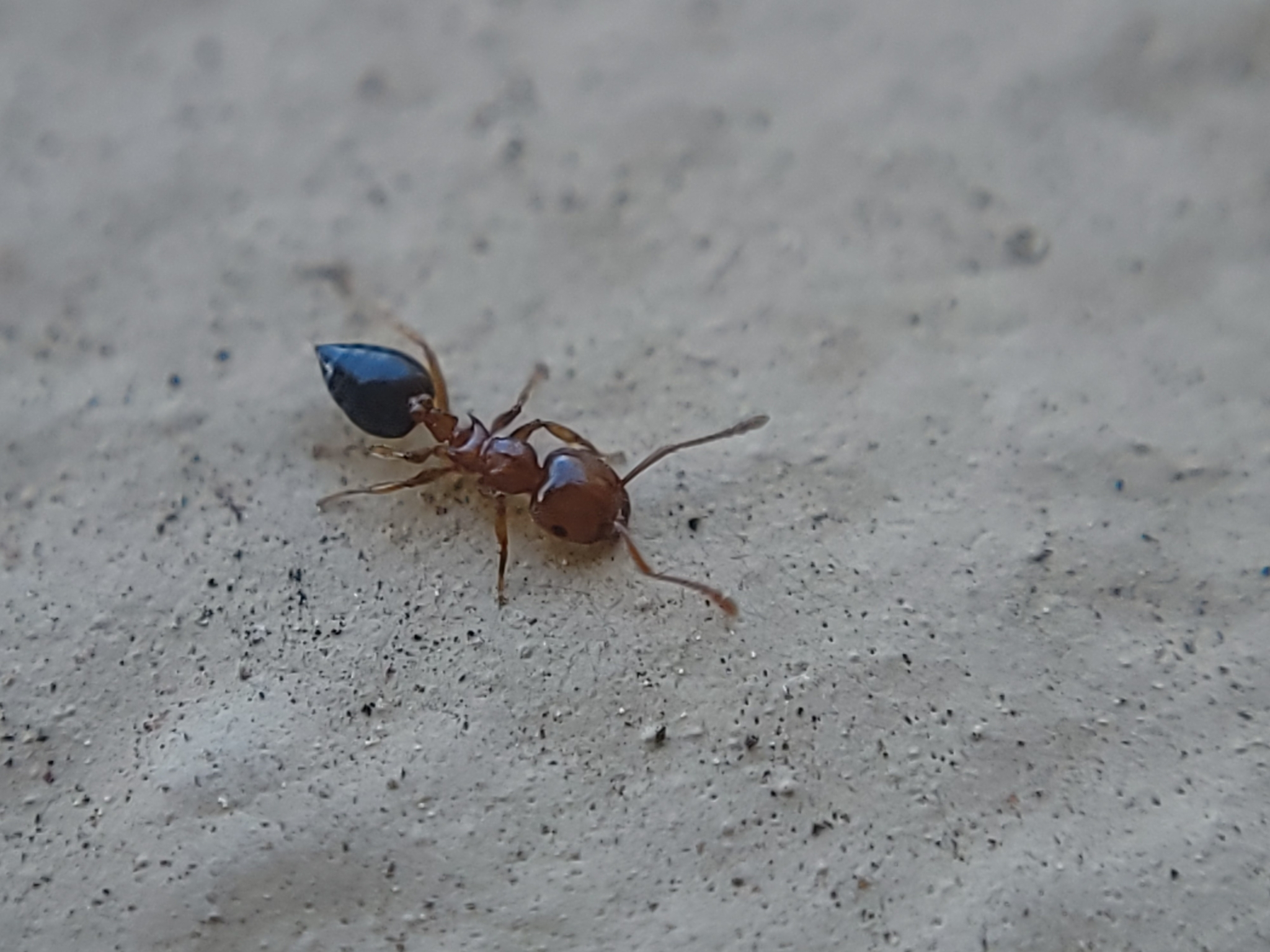

Scientific classification
- Domain: Eukaryota
- Kingdom: Animalia
- Phylum: Arthropoda
- Class: Insecta
- Order: Hymenoptera
- Family: Formicidae
- Subfamily: Myrmicinae
- Genus: Crematogaster
- Species: C. pinicola

Binomial name
- Crematogaster pinicola Deyrup, M. & Cover, S. P., 2007

= Crematogaster pinicola =

Species of ant

Crematogaster pinicola is a species of ant in the genus Crematogaster. It is commonly known as the Pine Tree Acrobat Ant.

The species name derives from pinus, meaning pine tree in Latin; and "cola", a Latin suffix meaning "dweller
