= Crematogaster biformis =

Scientific classification
- Domain: Eukaryota
- Kingdom: Animalia
- Phylum: Arthropoda
- Class: Insecta
- Order: Hymenoptera
- Family: Formicidae
- Subfamily: Myrmicinae
- Genus: Crematogaster
- Species: C. biformis

Binomial name
- Crematogaster biformis Andre, 1892

Species of ant

Crematogaster biformis is a species of ant in tribe Crematogastrini. It was described by Andre in 1892.
