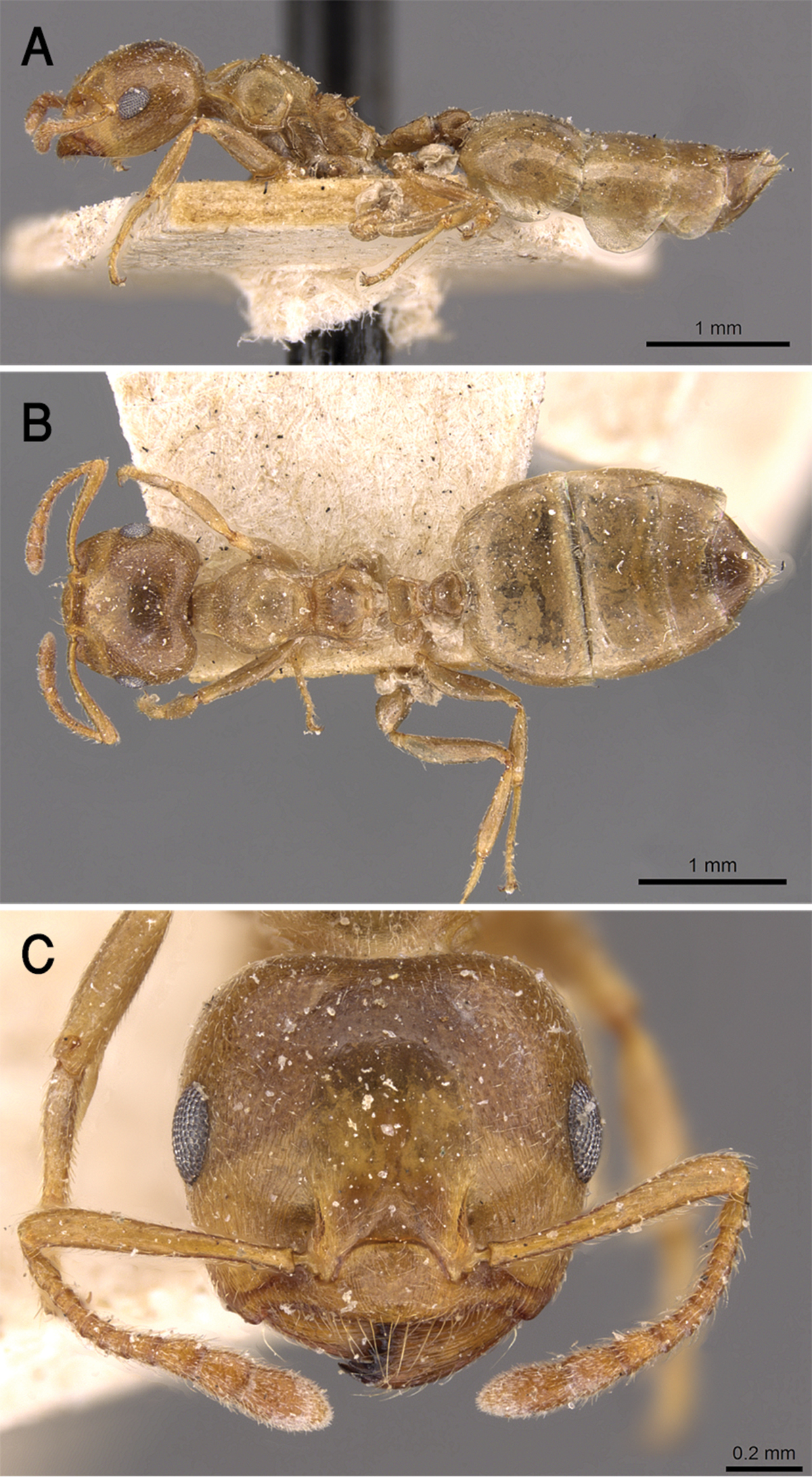

Scientific classification
- Domain: Eukaryota
- Kingdom: Animalia
- Phylum: Arthropoda
- Class: Insecta
- Order: Hymenoptera
- Family: Formicidae
- Subfamily: Myrmicinae
- Genus: Crematogaster
- Species: C. acaciae

Binomial name
- Crematogaster acaciae Forel, 1892

= Crematogaster acaciae =

Species of ant

Crematogaster acaciae is a species of ant in tribe Crematogastrini. It was described by Forel in 1892.
