= Crematogaster gordani =

Scientific classification
- Domain: Eukaryota
- Kingdom: Animalia
- Phylum: Arthropoda
- Class: Insecta
- Order: Hymenoptera
- Family: Formicidae
- Subfamily: Myrmicinae
- Genus: Crematogaster
- Species: C. gordani

Binomial name
- Crematogaster gordani Karaman, M., 2008

Species of ant

Crematogaster gordani species of ant in the subfamily Myrmicinae.
