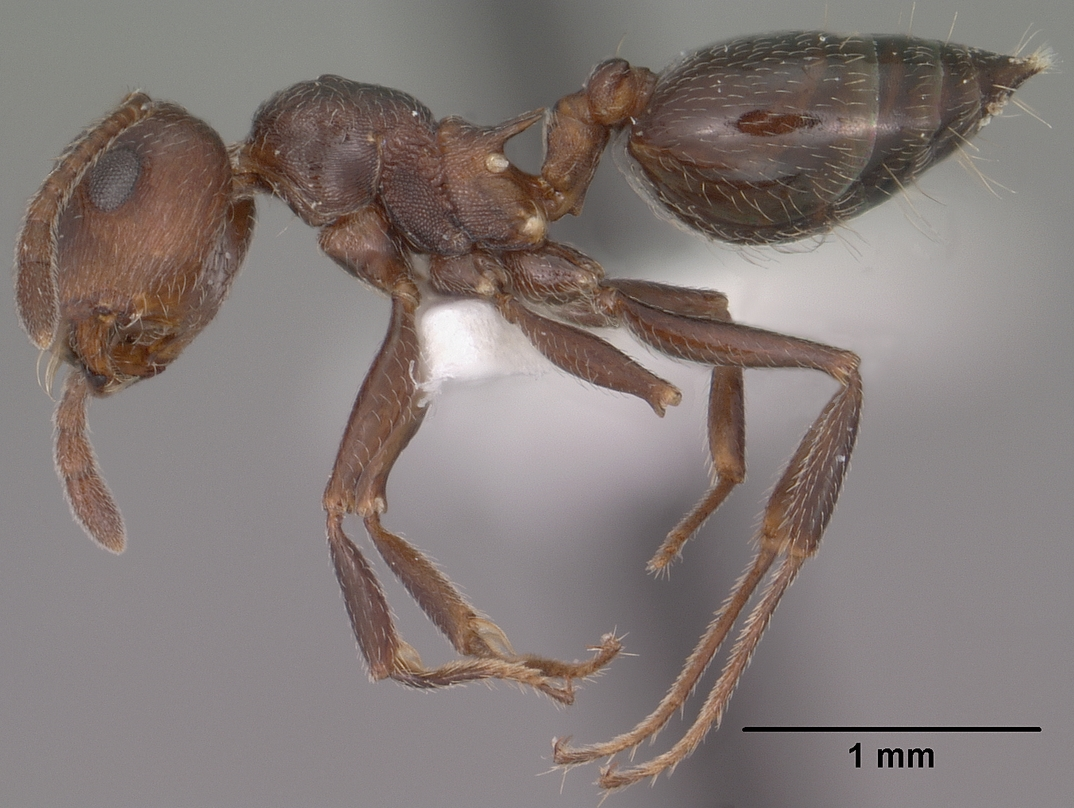

Scientific classification
- Kingdom: Animalia
- Phylum: Arthropoda
- Class: Insecta
- Order: Hymenoptera
- Family: Formicidae
- Subfamily: Myrmicinae
- Genus: Crematogaster
- Species: C. colei

Binomial name
- Crematogaster colei Buren, 1968

= Crematogaster colei =

Species of ant

Crematogaster colei is a species of ant in tribe Crematogastrini. It was described by Buren in 1968.
