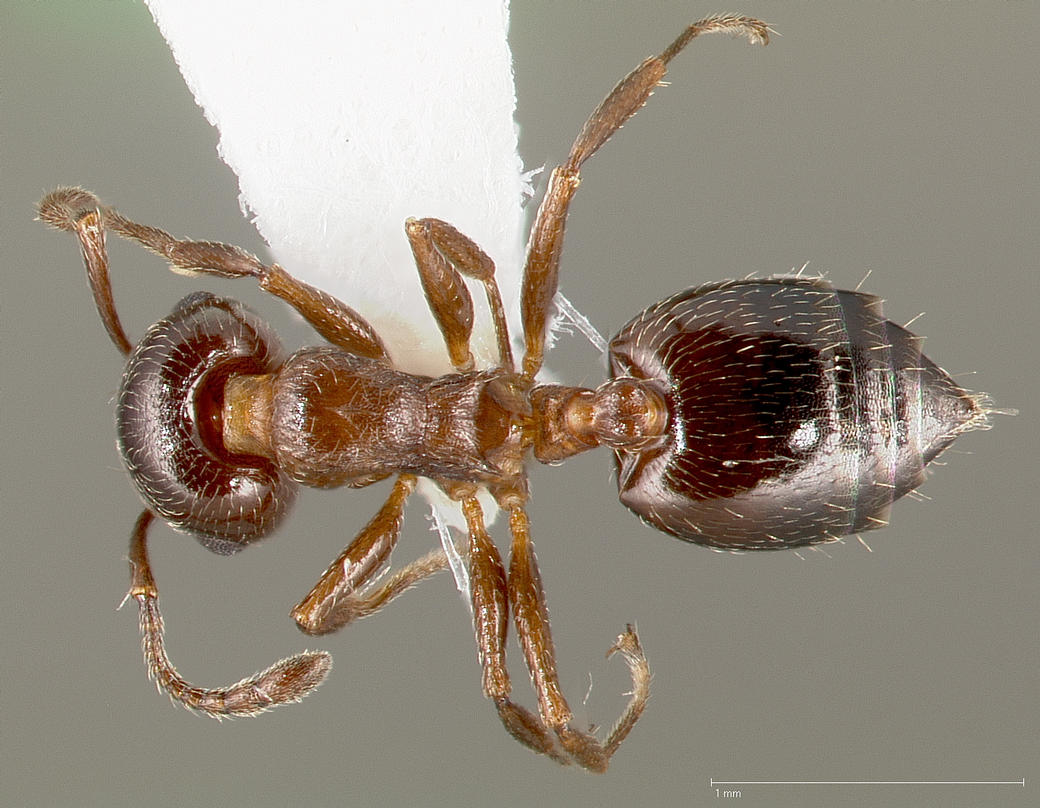

Scientific classification
- Domain: Eukaryota
- Kingdom: Animalia
- Phylum: Arthropoda
- Class: Insecta
- Order: Hymenoptera
- Family: Formicidae
- Subfamily: Myrmicinae
- Tribe: Crematogastrini
- Genus: Crematogaster
- Species: C. marioni

Binomial name
- Crematogaster marioni Buren, 1968

= Crematogaster marioni =

Species of ant

Crematogaster marioni is a species of ant in the family Formicidae.

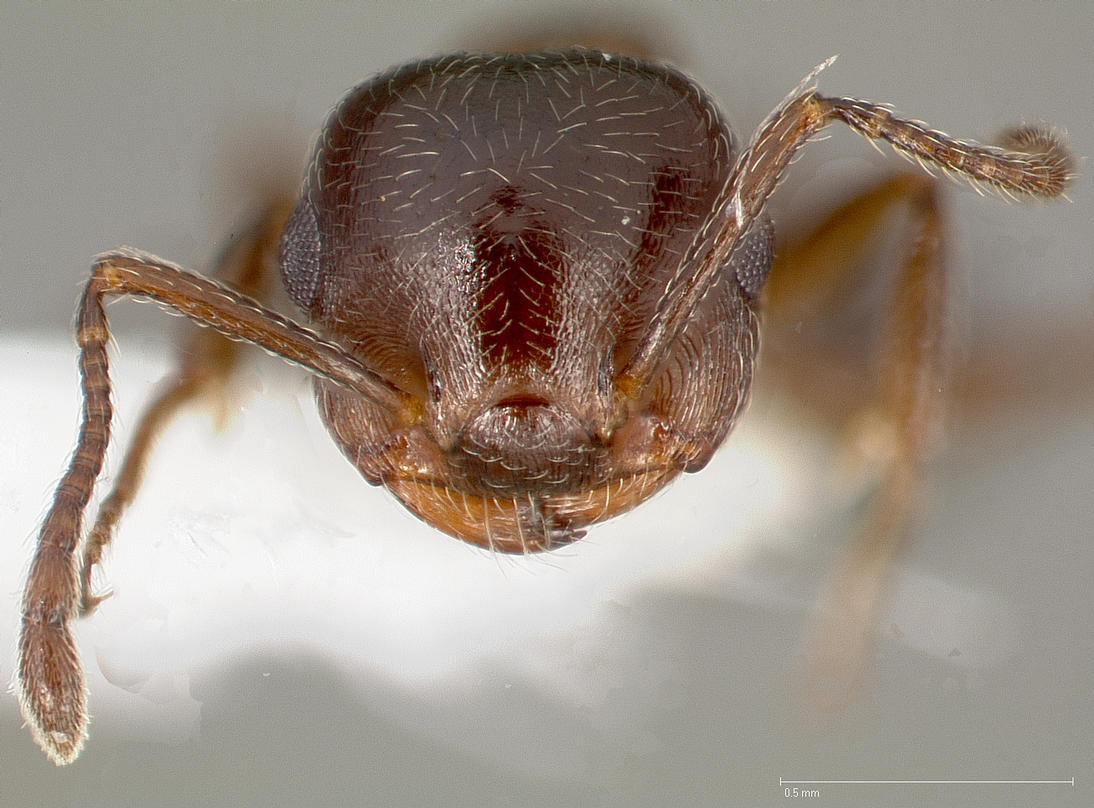

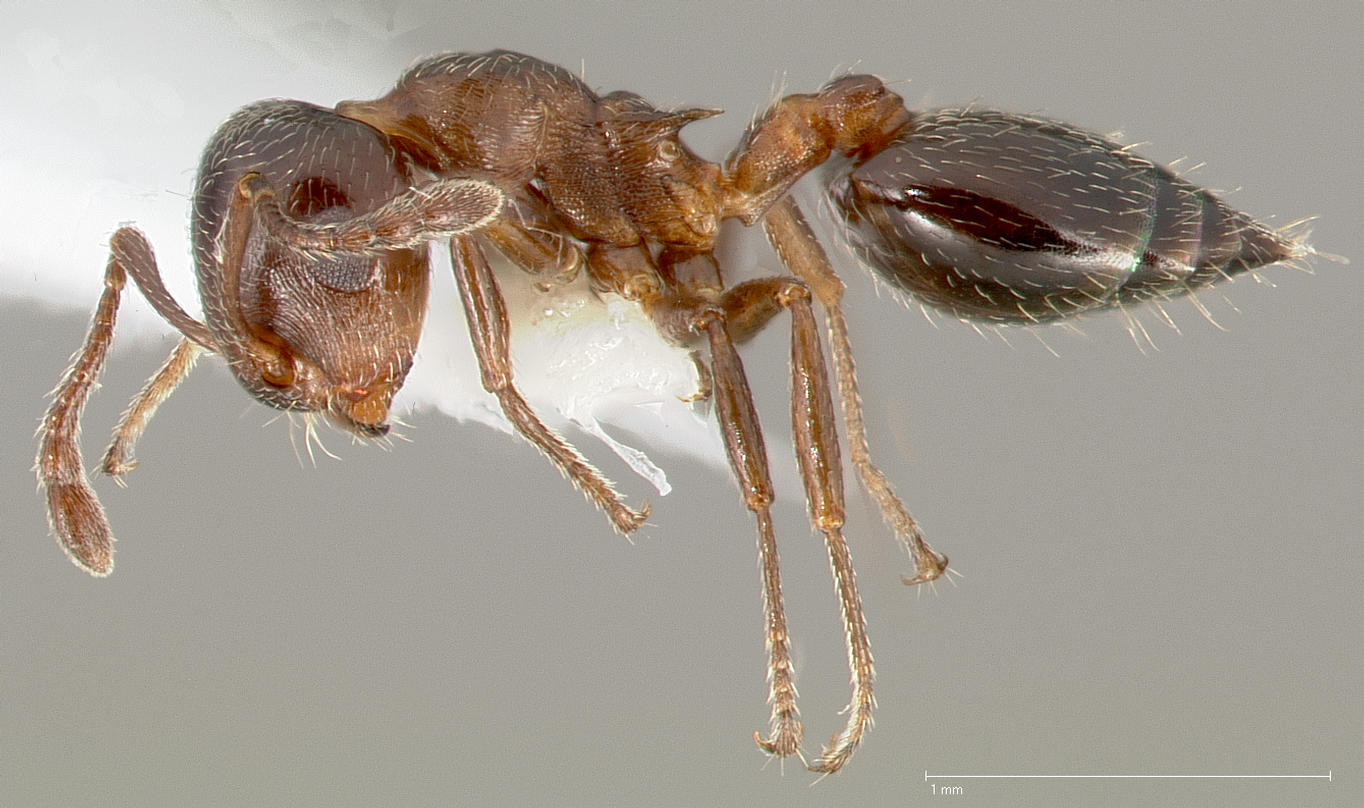
