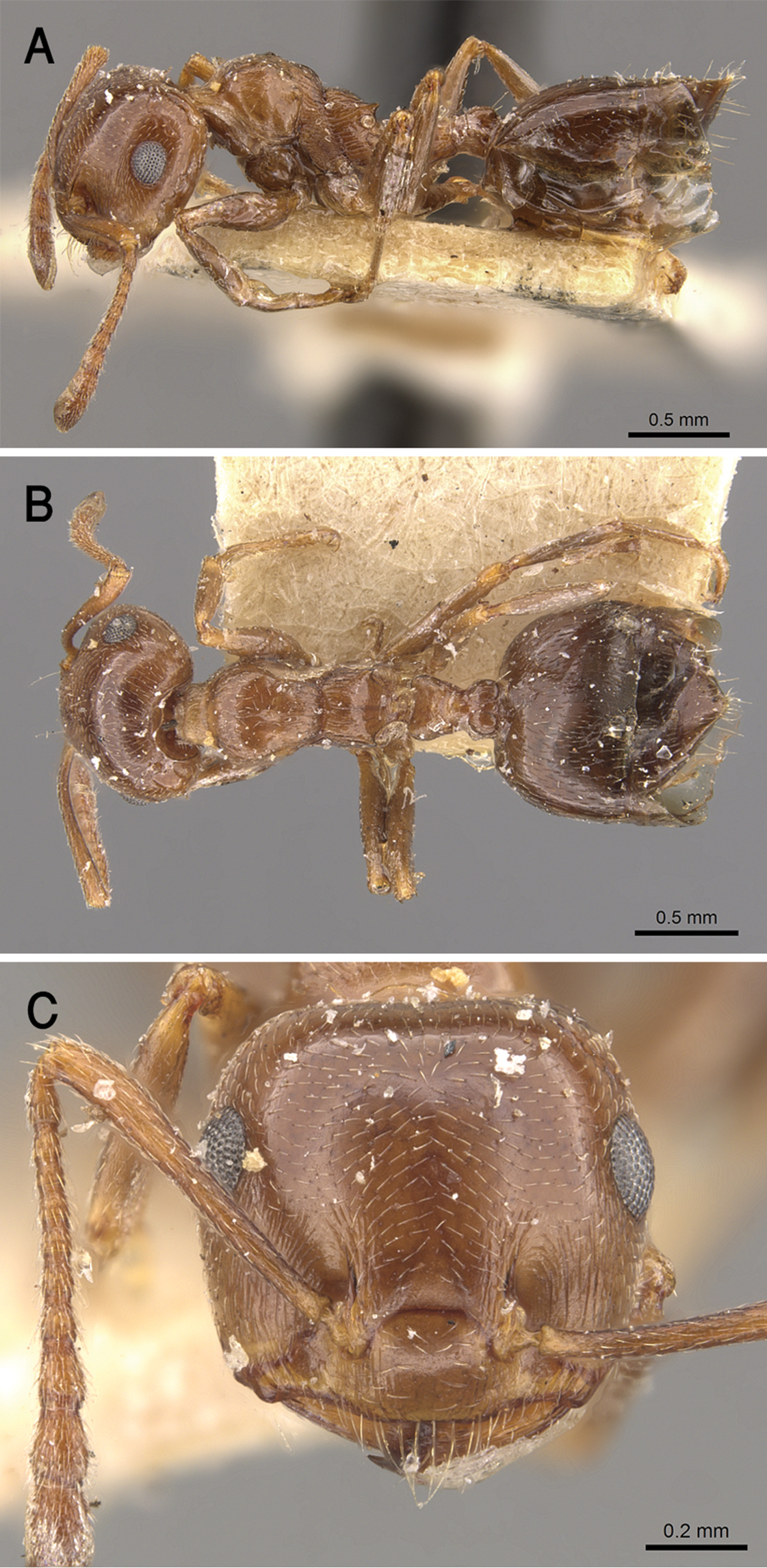

Scientific classification
- Domain: Eukaryota
- Kingdom: Animalia
- Phylum: Arthropoda
- Class: Insecta
- Order: Hymenoptera
- Family: Formicidae
- Subfamily: Myrmicinae
- Genus: Crematogaster
- Species: C. antaris

Binomial name
- Crematogaster antaris Forel, 1894

= Crematogaster antaris =

Species of ant

Crematogaster antaris is a species of ant in tribe Crematogastrini. It was described by Forel in 1894.
