= Crematogaster buddhae =

Scientific classification
- Domain: Eukaryota
- Kingdom: Animalia
- Phylum: Arthropoda
- Class: Insecta
- Order: Hymenoptera
- Family: Formicidae
- Subfamily: Myrmicinae
- Genus: Crematogaster
- Species: C. buddhae

Binomial name
- Crematogaster buddhae Forel, 1902

Species of ant

Crematogaster buddhae is a species of ant in tribe Crematogastrini. It was described by Forel in 1902. It is found across South and South-East Asia.

== Distribution and habitat ==
It is found in Northeast and South India, Bangladesh, Nepal, Malaysia and Singapore.
