= Crematogaster brevimandibularis =

Scientific classification
- Domain: Eukaryota
- Kingdom: Animalia
- Phylum: Arthropoda
- Class: Insecta
- Order: Hymenoptera
- Family: Formicidae
- Subfamily: Myrmicinae
- Genus: Crematogaster
- Species: C. brevimandibularis

Binomial name
- Crematogaster brevimandibularis Donisthorpe, 1943

Species of ant

Crematogaster brevimandibularis is a species of ant in tribe Crematogastrini. It was described by Donisthorpe in 1943.
