= Crematogaster pellens =

Scientific classification
- Kingdom: Animalia
- Phylum: Arthropoda
- Clade: Pancrustacea
- Class: Insecta
- Order: Hymenoptera
- Family: Formicidae
- Subfamily: Myrmicinae
- Genus: Crematogaster
- Species: C. pellens

Binomial name
- Crematogaster pellens Walker, 1859

Species of ant

Crematogaster pellens is a species of ant of the subfamily Myrmicinae. It can be found from Sri Lanka.
