= Crematogaster aloysiisabaudiae =

Scientific classification
- Domain: Eukaryota
- Kingdom: Animalia
- Phylum: Arthropoda
- Class: Insecta
- Order: Hymenoptera
- Family: Formicidae
- Subfamily: Myrmicinae
- Genus: Crematogaster
- Species: C. aloysiisabaudiae

Binomial name
- Crematogaster aloysiisabaudiae Menozzi, 1930

Species of ant

Crematogaster aloysiisabaudiae is a species of ant in tribe Crematogastrini. It was described by Menozzi in 1930.
