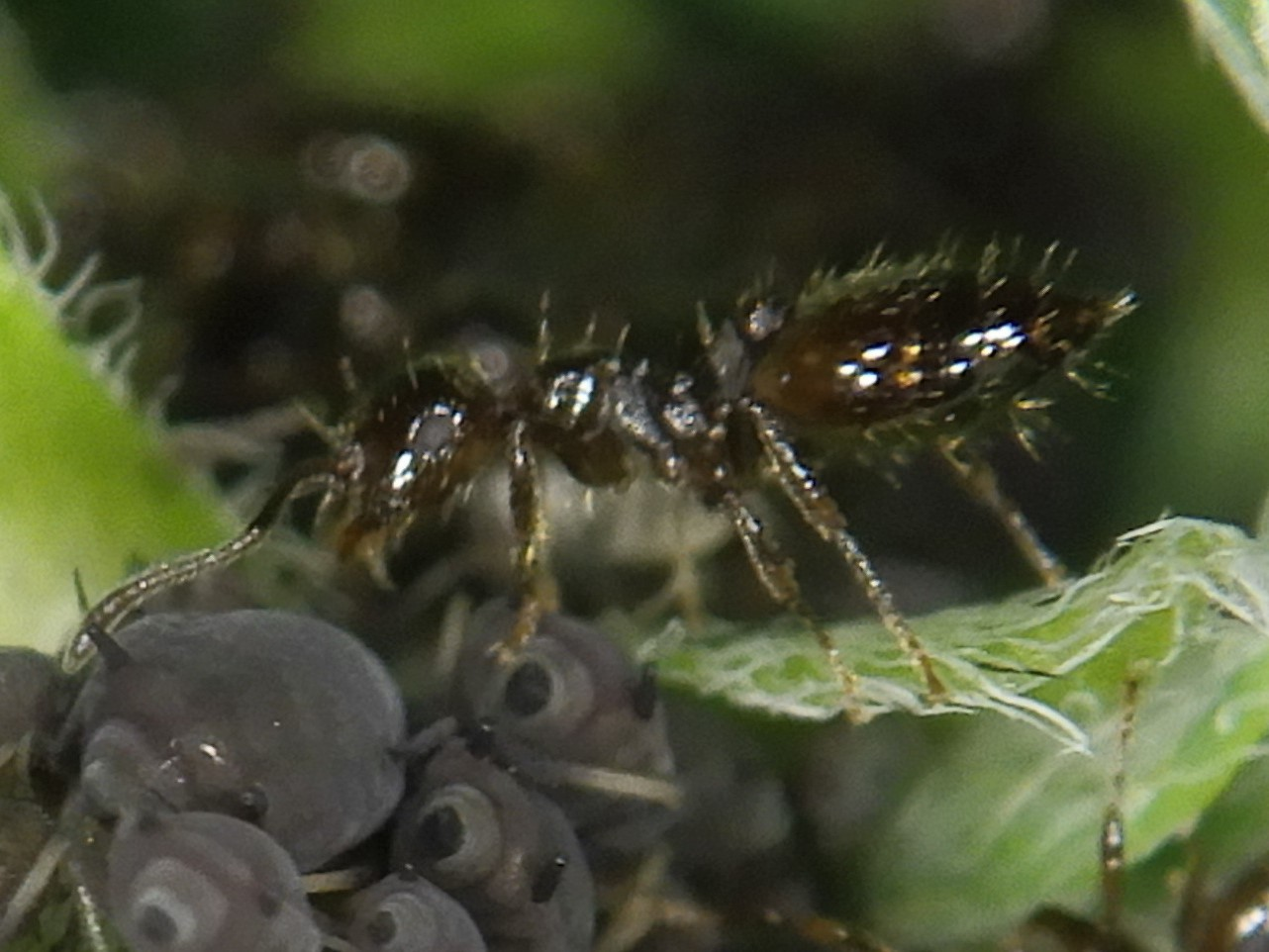

Scientific classification
- Domain: Eukaryota
- Kingdom: Animalia
- Phylum: Arthropoda
- Class: Insecta
- Order: Hymenoptera
- Family: Formicidae
- Subfamily: Myrmicinae
- Genus: Crematogaster
- Species: C. bogojawlenskii

Binomial name
- Crematogaster bogojawlenskii Ruzsky, 1905

= Crematogaster bogojawlenskii =

Species of ant

Crematogaster bogojawlenskii is a species of ant in the tribe Crematogastrini.
