= Crematogaster captiosa =

Scientific classification
- Domain: Eukaryota
- Kingdom: Animalia
- Phylum: Arthropoda
- Class: Insecta
- Order: Hymenoptera
- Family: Formicidae
- Subfamily: Myrmicinae
- Genus: Crematogaster
- Species: C. captiosa

Binomial name
- Crematogaster captiosa Forel, 1911

Species of ant

Crematogaster captiosa is a species of ant in tribe Crematogastrini. It was described by Forel in 1911.
