= Crematogaster abouzeidi =

Scientific classification
- Kingdom: Animalia
- Phylum: Arthropoda
- Clade: Pancrustacea
- Class: Insecta
- Order: Hymenoptera
- Family: Formicidae
- Subfamily: Myrmicinae
- Genus: Crematogaster
- Species: C. abouzeidi

Binomial name
- Crematogaster abouzeidi Sharaf, 2024

Species of ant

Crematogaster abouzeidi is a species of ant in the family Formicidae, subfamily Myrmicinae.

== Discovery ==
This species was discovered in Yemen in 2024. Upon discovery its similarities to the species Crematogaster flaviventris were noted by the team of researchers. They posed a possibility that this species has been recorded before as flaviventris, but no evidence has been found to support that claim.
