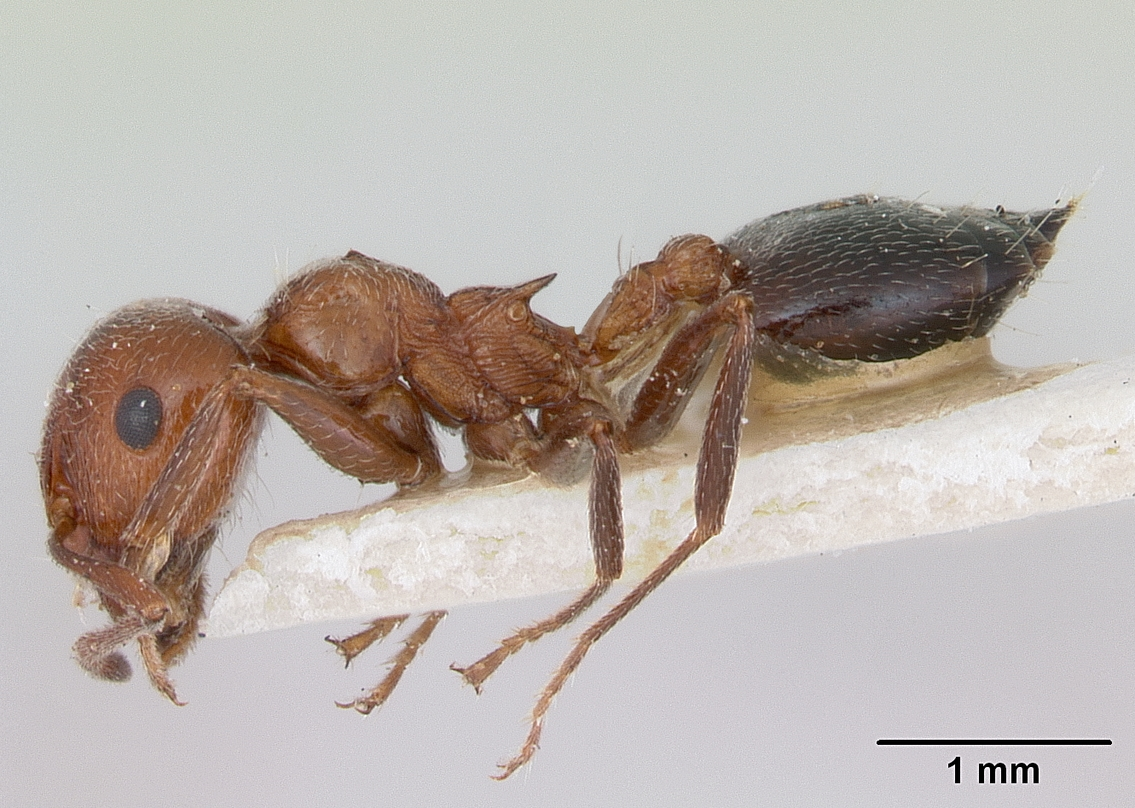
- Crematogaster aegyptiaca worker

Scientific classification
- Domain: Eukaryota
- Kingdom: Animalia
- Phylum: Arthropoda
- Class: Insecta
- Order: Hymenoptera
- Family: Formicidae
- Subfamily: Myrmicinae
- Genus: Crematogaster
- Species: C. aegyptiaca

Binomial name
- Crematogaster aegyptiaca Mayr, 1862

= Crematogaster aegyptiaca =

Species of ant

Crematogaster aegyptiaca is an uncommon species of ant found mostly in Egypt.
