= Crematogaster consternens =

Scientific classification
- Kingdom: Animalia
- Phylum: Arthropoda
- Clade: Pancrustacea
- Class: Insecta
- Order: Hymenoptera
- Family: Formicidae
- Subfamily: Myrmicinae
- Genus: Crematogaster
- Species: C. consternens

Binomial name
- Crematogaster consternens (Walker, 1859)

Synonyms
- Myrmica consternens Walker, 1859

Species of ant

Crematogaster consternens is a species of ant of the subfamily Myrmicinae. It is endemic to Sri Lanka.
