= List of ants of Kansas =

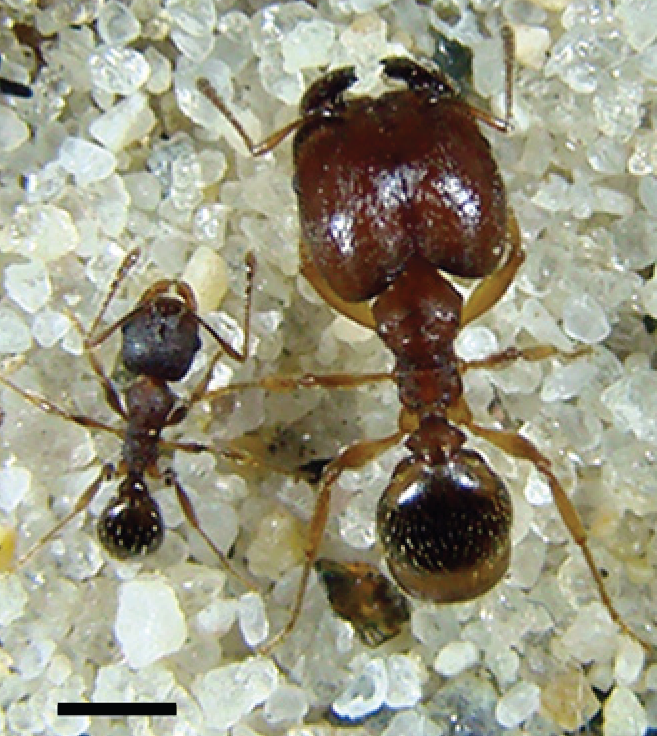
Pheidole pilifera minor and major workers. Scale: 1mm.

Over 100 species of ants can be found in the Midwestern state of Kansas.

== Kansas ants ==
Kansas ant species include common ants and ones with wings. Some Kansas ants create mounds that are a common sight - Pogonomyrmex occidentalis, Formica subsericea, Formica montana, and Formica planipilis.

Ants of the subfamily Dolichoderinae are frequently found in Kansas. Dolichoderine ants may be the only ants that can survive in Kansas' harsher environments.

Ants of the subfamily Dorylinae mostly go unnoticed in Kansas because they can not tolerate direct sunlight. Neivamyrmex nigrescens and Neivamyrmex opacithorax are the most commonly found ants of this rarely seen subfamily.

Crematogaster punctulata and Monomorium carbonarium of the subfamily Myrmicinae are frequently found in Kansas while many others are not as abundant.

The only ant of the subfamily Ponerinae that is found in all of Kansas is Hypoponera opacior. Despite Ponera pennsylvanica not being found statewide, the species is also commonly found in Kansas along with Hypoponera opacior.

Ants of the subfamily Formicinae are the second most abundant species in Kansas, right after Myrmicinae ants. Ants in the genus Camponotus and Formica are the most commonly found in this subfamily.

== Kansas ants as pests ==
Ants that are commonly called pests are red imported fire ants, acrobat ants, big-headed ants, carpenter ants, cornfield ants, harvester ants, larger yellow ant, little black ants, mound ants, spinewaisted ants, and thief ants. It is known that these pest species can survive through Kansas' less harsh winters.

== List ==
- Aphaenogaster fulva
- Aphaenogaster mariae
- Aphaenogaster rudis
- Aphaenogaster tennesseensis
- Aphaenogaster texana
- Aphaenogaster treatae pluteicornis
- Brachymyrmex depilis
- Camponotus americanus
- Camponotus caryae
- Camponotus castaneus
- Camponotus decipiens
- Camponotus discolor
- Camponotus ferrugineus
- Camponotus impressus
- Camponotus nearcticus
- Camponotus pennsylvanicus
- Camponotus sayi
- Camponotus vicinus
- Crematogaster ashmeadi
- Crematogaster cerasi
- Crematogaster clara
- Crematogaster laeviuscula
- Crematogaster lineolata
- Crematogaster minutissima missouriensis
- Crematogaster punctulata
- Dolichoderus mariae
- Dorymyrmex flavus
- Dorymyrmex insanus
- Forelius sp.
- Formica bradleyi
- Formica canadensis
- Formica emeryi
- Formica exsectoides
- Formica montana
- Formica neogagates
- Formica neorufibarbis
- Formica ntidiventris
- Formica pallidefulva
- Formica perpilosa
- Formica planipilis
- Formica schaufussi dolosa
- Formica subintegra
- Formica subsericea
- Harpagoxenus americanus
- Hypoponera opacior
- Lasius alienus
- Lasius claviger
- Lasius flavus
- Lasius interjectus
- Lasius interjectus
- Lasius neoniger
- Lasius speculiventris
- Lasius umbratus
- Leptothorax ambiguus
- Leptothorax curvispinosus
- Leptothorax pergandei
- Leptothorax schaumi
- Leptothorax tricarinatus
- Monomorium minimum
- Monomorium pharaonis
- Myrmeceocystus mimicus
- Myrmeceocystus navajo
- Myrmeceocystus romainei
- Myrmecina americana
- Myrmica americana
- Myrmica punctiventris
- Neivamyrmex carolinensis
- Neivamyrmex fallax
- Neivamyrmex fuscipennis
- Neivamyrmex minor
- Neivamyrmex nigrescens
- Neivamyrmex opacithorax
- Paratrechina parvula
- Paratrechina terricola
- Paratrechina vividula
- Pheidole bicarinata
- Pheidole dentata
- Pheidole desertorum
- Pheidole pilifera coloradensis
- Pheidole pilifera pilifera
- Pheidole senex
- Pheidole sitarches campestris
- Pogonomyrmex apache
- Pogonomyrmex barbatus
- Pogonomyrmex comanche
- Pogonomyrmex maricopa
- Pogonomyrmex occidentalis
- Pogonomyrmex rugosus
- Polyergus breviceps
- Ponera pennsylvanica
- Prenolepis imparis
- Proceratium pergandei
- Proceratium silaceum
- Strumigenys dietrichi
- Strumigenys laevinasis
- Strumigenys ohioensis
- Strumigenys pilinasis
- Strumigenys pulchella
- Strumigenys reflexa
- Solenopsis molesta
- Solenopsis texana
- Solenopsis xyloni
- Stenamma brevicorne
- Stigmatomma pallipes
- Tapinoma melanocephalum
- Tapinoma sessile
