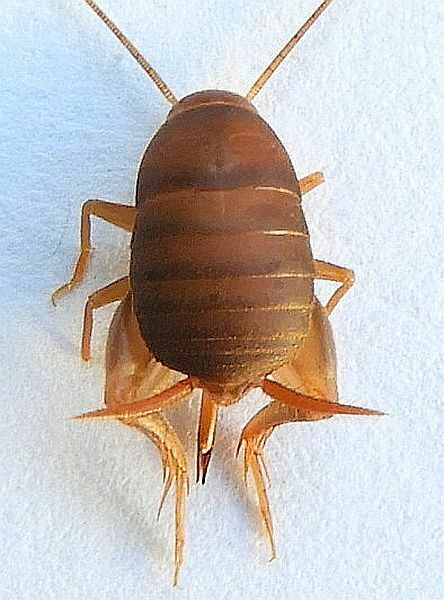

Scientific classification
- Kingdom: Animalia
- Phylum: Arthropoda
- Class: Insecta
- Order: Orthoptera
- Suborder: Ensifera
- Family: Myrmecophilidae
- Genus: Myrmecophilus
- Species: M. pergandei

Binomial name
- Myrmecophilus pergandei Bruner, 1884

= Myrmecophilus pergandei =

Species of cricket

Myrmecophilus pergandei, the eastern ant cricket, is a species of ant cricket in the family Myrmecophilidae. It is found in North America. It is a wingless cricket that is an obligate kleptoparasite of ants living in their nests. They lack both wings and tympanal organs on the front tibia.

== Distribution ==
They have been found in the United States, in the following states: Colorado, Georgia, Illinois, Louisiana, Maryland, Massachusetts, Mississippi, Nebraska, New Hampshire, New Jersey, New York, Oklahoma, Pennsylvania, and Virginia.

== Ant hosts ==
M. pergandei has been observed with the following ants: Lasius umbratus, Camponotus castaneus, Camponotus chromaiodes, Camponotus herculeanus, Camponotus novaeboracensis, Formica obscuriventris, Formica pallidefulva, Formica subsericea, Aphaenogaster treatae, Crematogaster lineolata, and Tapinoma sessile.

== Biology ==
Ant crickets lives as an inquiline within ants' nests. M. pergandei is known to live with eleven ant species. This specialized way of life has led this insect and its relatives to evolve many morphological differences compared to other orthopterans, including complete absence of wings and hearing organs, and much reduced eyesight, as well as their very small size. These tiny insects are dark brown with paler bands and prominent cerci, which serve as their primary sensory organs. Adults are found throughout the year, and take up to two years to reach maturity.

== Description ==
The general form of the insect, when looking at it from above, is oval, with the smallest part being at the head. The latter is depressed and deeply sunken into the front margin of the pronotum. The basal joint of the antennae is very large and globular, with a few short bristle-like hairs encircling the insertion of the second joint. The remaining joints gradually decrease in size toward the apex. The antennae are as long as the body, with the base being pale yellowish and the remaining portion rufous. The eyes are small and black, composed of a group of ocelli-like cells. They are situated immediately behind the base of the antenna, and in dried specimens, they are partly concealed by the front margin of the pronotum. The anterior legs are small and slightly compressed, and they are unarmed. The posterior femora are greatly enlarged, compressed, ovate incrassate, while the tibiae are stout, slightly compressed, shorter than the femora, and furnished with four movable spines on the inner and two on the outer edge. The apex has four long spurs, and the tarsi are plain. The cerci are stout, acuminate, slightly thickest in the middle, quite hairy, and as long as the abdomen. They are a trifle heaviest in the male. The ovipositor is slender and larger than usual, with the valves of equal lengths.

The insect has a big and wide pronotum that is narrow in front and wide at the back. Its edges are straight. The meso- and meta-notum segments are the same size and much bigger than the first abdominal segment. It is mainly ochraceous and piceous in color, except for the front margin of the pronotum, hind margins of the thoracic and abdominal segments, and the apex of the ovipositor which are dark brown. A special feature of this species is the two light-colored elliptical markings on the pronotum disc. They are 3.85 mm in length.
