= Myrmecophilus americanus =

Scientific classification
- Domain: Eukaryota
- Kingdom: Animalia
- Phylum: Arthropoda
- Class: Insecta
- Order: Orthoptera
- Suborder: Ensifera
- Family: Myrmecophilidae
- Genus: Myrmecophilus
- Species: M. americanus

Binomial name
- Myrmecophilus americanus Saussure, 1877

Species of cricket-like animal

Myrmecophilus americanus is an ant cricket, a wingless cricket that is an obligate parasite of ants and lives in their nests.

It is found living in the nest of the longhorn crazy ant (Paratrechina longicornis) and is kleptoparasitic on it, feeding on food scraps brought back by the workers and encouraging them to regurgitate food. It may be assisted in this symbiosis by mimicry as it resembles the gaster of the ant queen in both size and shape. Although it seems to be largely host specific, it has on at least one occasion been found in the nest of another species of ant, and other members of the genus Myrmecophilus have multiple host species.
