= Myrmecophilus oregonensis =

Scientific classification
- Domain: Eukaryota
- Kingdom: Animalia
- Phylum: Arthropoda
- Class: Insecta
- Order: Orthoptera
- Suborder: Ensifera
- Family: Myrmecophilidae
- Genus: Myrmecophilus
- Species: M. oregonensis

Binomial name
- Myrmecophilus oregonensis Bruner, 1884

Species of cricket

Myrmecophilus oregonensis, known generally as the Oregon ant cricket or west coast ant cricket, is a species of ant cricket in the family Myrmecophilidae. It is found in North America.
