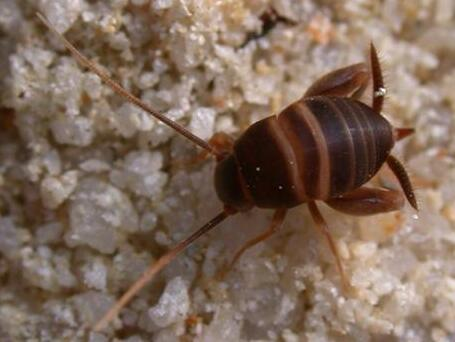
- Myrmecophilus acervorum

Scientific classification
- Kingdom: Animalia
- Phylum: Arthropoda
- Clade: Pancrustacea
- Class: Insecta
- Order: Orthoptera
- Suborder: Ensifera
- Family: Myrmecophilidae
- Genus: Myrmecophilus; Berthold, 1827

= Myrmecophilus =

Genus of cricket-like animals

Myrmecophilus or ant crickets, is a genus of orthopteran insects in the family Myrmecophilidae. This genus contains the majority of myrmecophilous (ant-loving) species in this small, obscure family.

== Species ==
With a worldwide distribution, species include:

- M. acervorum (Panzer, 1799)
- M. aequispina Chopard, 1923
- M. americanus Saussure, 1877
- M. arboreus Maeyama & Terayama, 1994
- M. australis Tepper, 1896
- M. baronii Baccetti, 1966
- M. brevipalpis Chopard, 1948
- M. bifasciatus Fischer von Waldheim, 1846
- M. bituberculatus Ingrisch, 2001
- M. chocolatinus Gorochov, 1992
- M. concolor Chopard, 1928
- M. cottami Chopard, 1922
- M. crenatus Gorochov, 1986
- M. denticaudus Bei-Bienko, 1967
- M. dubius Saussure, 1877
- M. escherichi Schimmer, 1911
- M. formosanus Shiraki, 1930
- M. gigas Ichikawa, 2001
- M. gracilipes Chopard, 1924
- M. haeckeli Fernando, 1962
- M. hebardi Mann, 1920
- M. hirticaudus Fischer von Waldheim, 1846
- M. horii Maruyama, 2004
- M. inaequalis Ingrisch, 2010
- M. ishikawai Maruyama, 2004
- M. jordanicus Stalling, 2024
- M. keyi Baccetti, 1975
- M. kinomurai Maruyama, 2004
- M. kubotai Maruyama, 2004
- M. leei Kistner & Chong, 2007
- M. longitarsis Chopard, 1925
- M. manni Schimmer, 1911
- M. mauritanicus (H. Lucas, 1849)
- M. mayaealberti Hugel & Matyot, 2006
- M. mjobergi Chopard, 1925
- M. myrmecophilus (Savi, 1819)
- M. nigricornis Chopard, 1963
- M. nebrascensis Lugger, 1898
- M. nonveilleri Ingrisch & Pavicévić, 2008
- M. ochraceus Fischer, 1853
- M. oculatus Miram, 1930
- M. oregonensis Bruner, 1884
- M. orientalis Stalling, 2010
- M. pallidithorax Chopard, 1930
- M. parachilnus (Otte & Alexander, 1983)
- M. pergandei Bruner, 1884
- M. polyrhachi Ingrisch, 1987
- M. quadrispina Perkins, 1899
- M. sanctaehelenae Chopard, 1970
- M. sapporensis Matsumura, 1904
- M. seychellensis Gorochov, 1994
- M. sinicus Bei-Bienko, 1956
- M. surcoufi Chopard, 1919
- M. teranishii Teranishi, 1914
- M. termitophilus Maran, 1959
- M. testaceus Chopard, 1925
- M. tetramorii Ichikawa, 2001
- M. tindalei Otte & Alexander, 1983
- M. wahrmani Chopard, 1963
- M. zorae Karaman, 1963
