= Myrmecophilus manni =

Scientific classification
- Domain: Eukaryota
- Kingdom: Animalia
- Phylum: Arthropoda
- Class: Insecta
- Order: Orthoptera
- Suborder: Ensifera
- Family: Myrmecophilidae
- Genus: Myrmecophilus
- Species: M. manni

Binomial name
- Myrmecophilus manni Schimmer, 1911

Species of cricket

Myrmecophilus manni is a species in the family Myrmecophilidae ("ant crickets"), in the order Orthoptera ("grasshoppers, crickets, katydids"). Common names are "Desert ant cricket" and "Mann's ant cricket". Myrmecophilus manni is found in North America.
