= Myrmecophilus nebrascensis =

Scientific classification
- Domain: Eukaryota
- Kingdom: Animalia
- Phylum: Arthropoda
- Class: Insecta
- Order: Orthoptera
- Suborder: Ensifera
- Family: Myrmecophilidae
- Genus: Myrmecophilus
- Species: M. nebrascensis

Binomial name
- Myrmecophilus nebrascensis Lugger, 1898

Species of cricket

Myrmecophilus nebrascensis, the Nebraska ant cricket, is a species of ant cricket in the family Myrmecophilidae. It is found in North America.
