= Myrmecina wesselensis =

Scientific classification
- Kingdom: Animalia
- Phylum: Arthropoda
- Clade: Pancrustacea
- Class: Insecta
- Order: Hymenoptera
- Family: Formicidae
- Subfamily: Myrmicinae
- Genus: Myrmecina
- Species: M. wesselensis

Binomial name
- Myrmecina wesselensis Shattuck, S. O., 2009

Species of ant

Myrmecina wesselensis is a species of ant discovered and described by Shattuck, S. O. in 2009. This species is known from a single worker collected foraging on the ground at night from the Wessel Islands, Northern Territory.
