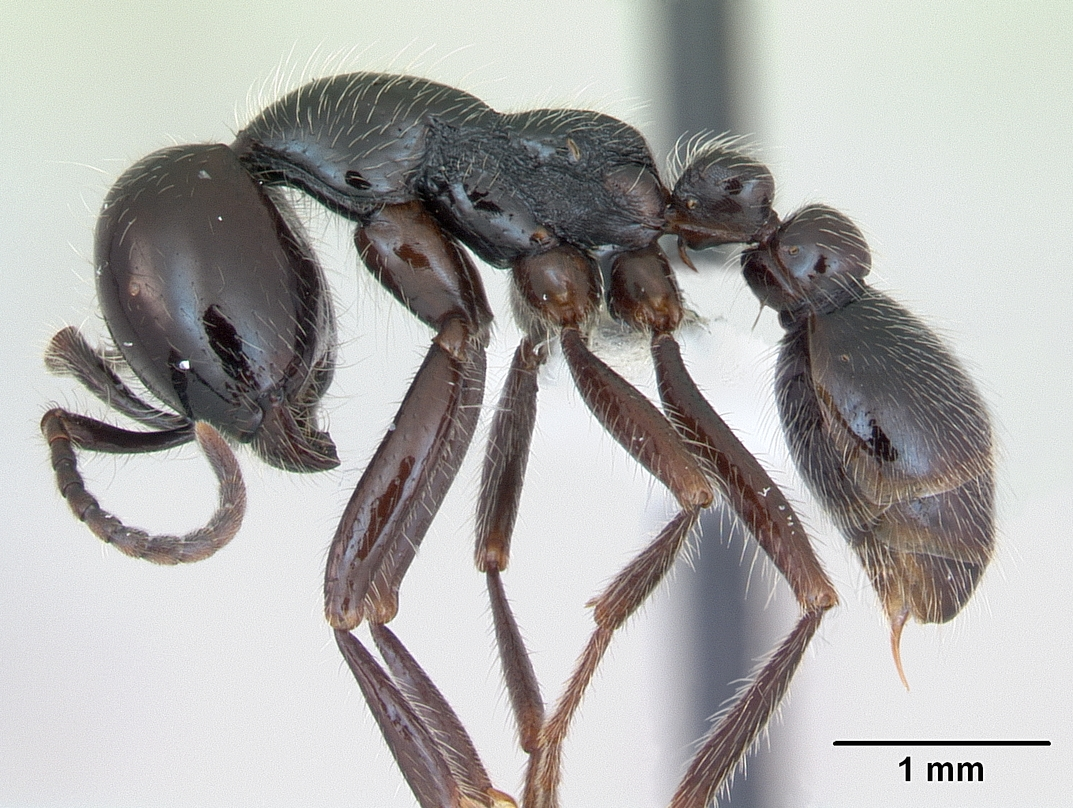

Scientific classification
- Kingdom: Animalia
- Phylum: Arthropoda
- Class: Insecta
- Order: Hymenoptera
- Family: Formicidae
- Genus: Neivamyrmex
- Species: N. pilosus

Binomial name
- Neivamyrmex pilosus (Smith, 1858)

= Neivamyrmex pilosus =

Species of ant

Neivamyrmex pilosus is a species of army ant in the family Formicidae.

== Subspecies ==
- Neivamyrmex pilosus beebei (Wheeler, 1921)
- Neivamyrmex pilosus mandibularis (Smith, 1942)
- Neivamyrmex pilosus mexicanus (Smith, 1859)
- Neivamyrmex pilosus pilosus (Smith, 1858)
