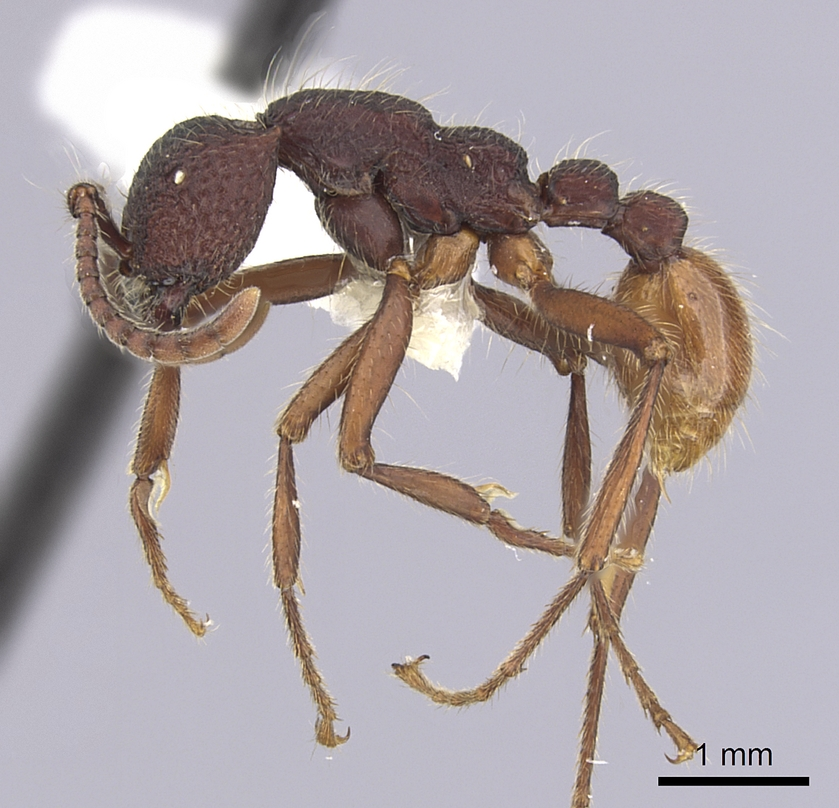
- A Neivamyrmex sumichrasti specimen seen in profile

Scientific classification
- Kingdom: Animalia
- Phylum: Arthropoda
- Class: Insecta
- Order: Hymenoptera
- Family: Formicidae
- Genus: Neivamyrmex
- Species: N. sumichrasti

Binomial name
- Neivamyrmex sumichrasti (Norton, 1868b)

Synonyms
- Eciton sumichrasti Norton, 1868a

= Neivamyrmex sumichrasti =

Species of ant

Neivamyrmex sumichrasti is a species of doryline army ant in the genus Neivamyrmex. It is found in Central America, from southern Mexico to Costa Rica.

== Name ==
The species was first named Eciton sumichrasti by Edward Norton in 1868, in commemoration of Swiss-Mexican naturalist François Sumichrast, who identified the species. Identification with the genus Eciton is now obsolete, and it is recognized as belonging to the genus Neivamyrmex.

== Range ==
Neivamyrmex sumichrasti has a Central American distribution. It is found from southern Mexico south to Costa Rica. It specializes in Cloud Forest habitats. It is common in Monteverde, Costa Rica, occurring from 1300m on the Pacific side and as low as 900m on the Atlantic side. In Mexico, it is found in Chiapas, San Luis Potosí, Veracruz, and Yucatán.

== Description ==
The head and mesosoma have multiple rounded depressions on them, and the overall colour can vary from black to dark reddish-brown. The face, when viewed head on, shows triangular projections. It is more coarsely punctated than other species in its genus, with its face and dorsum granulopunctate. It appears matte, not shining. Raid columns resemble those of Simopelta, a genus of Ponerimorph ants, due to convergent evolution.

== Behaviour ==
Neivamyrmex sumichrasti, like other army ants, live in large colonies and forage through raiding. It raids both diurnally and nocturnally. The raids most often take place above ground while its bivouac sites are presumably subterranean. Its diet consists chiefly of ant larvae, and it does engage in cannibalism.

Its large raid columns act as a host to other species. These include various staphylinids of the subtribe myrmedoniina. The staphylinids Ecitosius gracilis and Ecitosius robustus have evolved a similar colouration and punctation pattern as N. sumichrasti. These species are adapted to living in the army ant host. The staphylinid Ecitana biimpressa eat the larvae of N. sumichrasti, and can affect the amount of booty brought back through raids as well as the number of larvae that survive.

== Gallery ==
Specimens

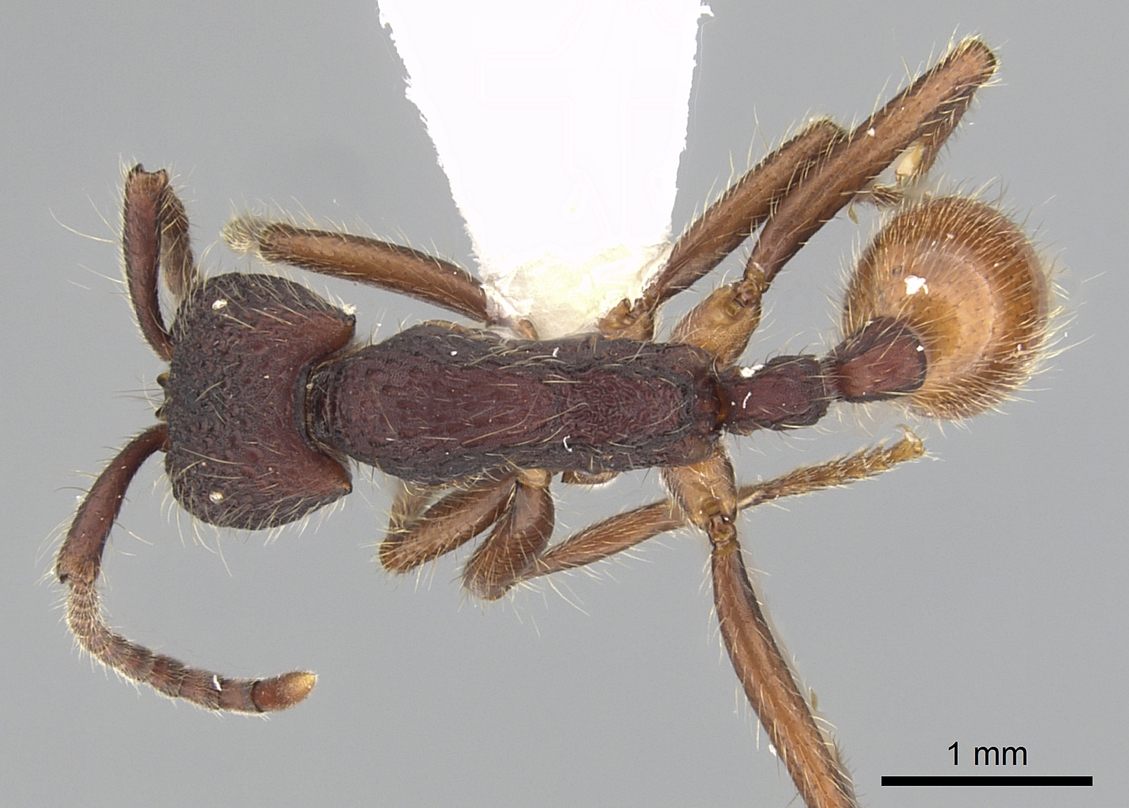
A specimen seen from above.

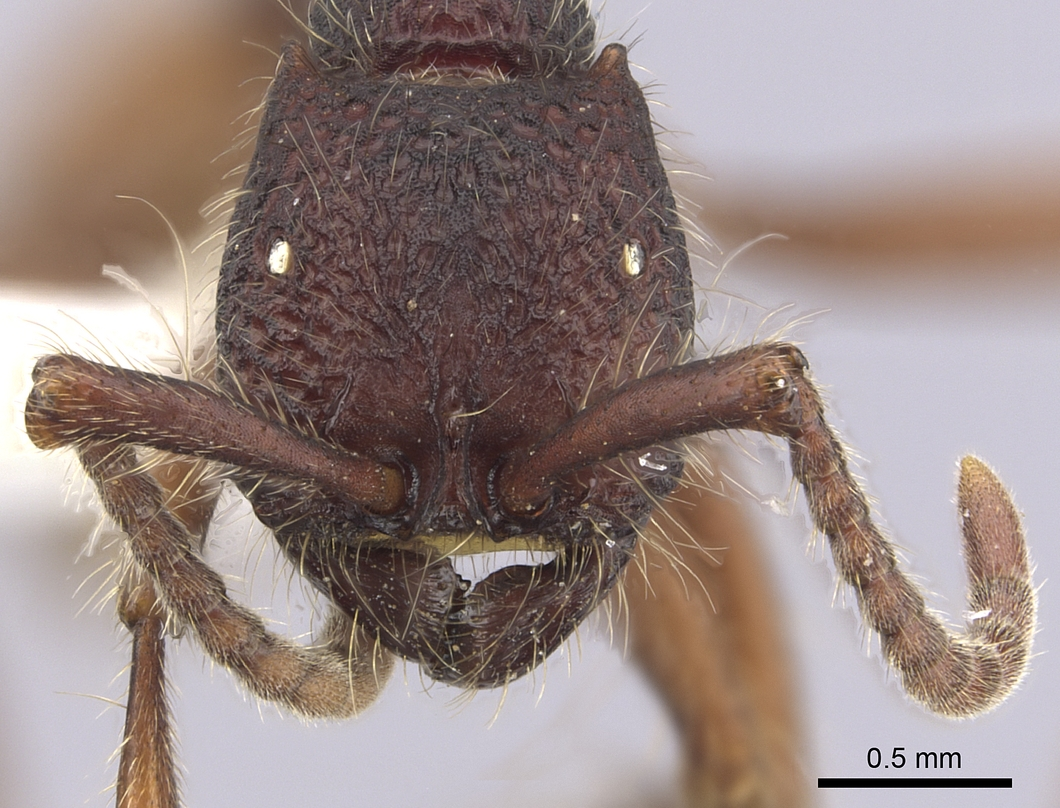
A specimen's head, seen from the front.

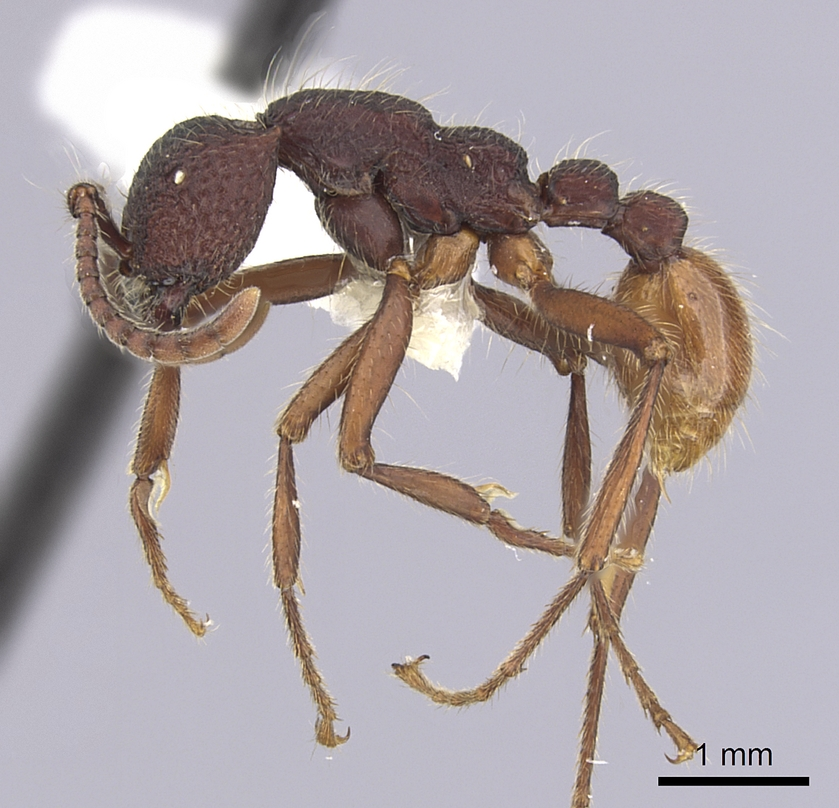
A specimen seen in profile.
