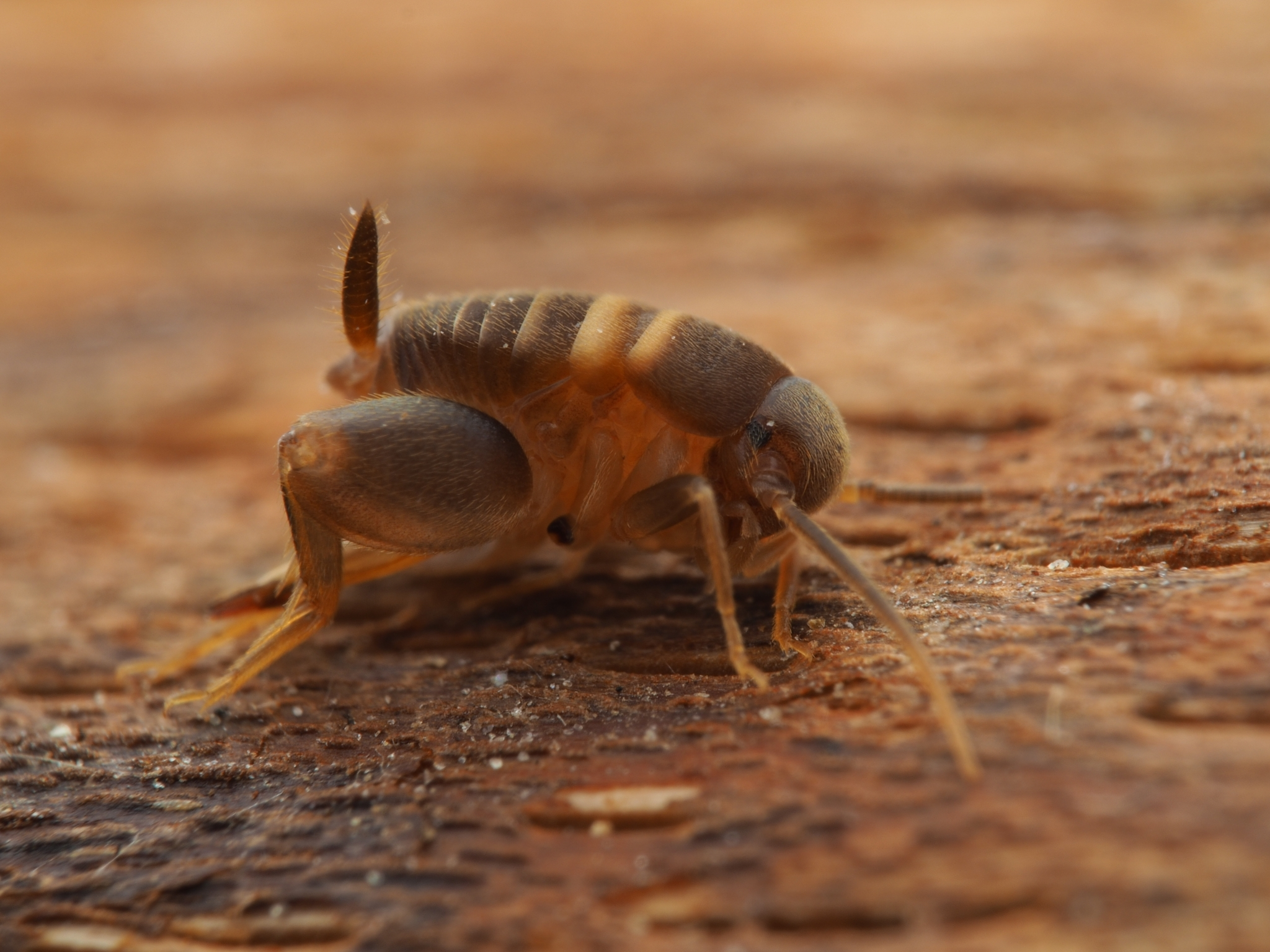

Scientific classification
- Kingdom: Animalia
- Phylum: Arthropoda
- Class: Insecta
- Order: Orthoptera
- Suborder: Ensifera
- Family: Myrmecophilidae
- Genus: Myrmecophilus
- Species: M. acervorum

Binomial name
- Myrmecophilus acervorum Panzer 1799

= Myrmecophilus acervorum =

Ants'-nest cricket

Species of cricket-like animal

Myrmecophilus acervorum is an orthopteran insect belonging to the family Myrmecophilidae (the ant-loving crickets). This continental European species is probably the most widespread and most frequently encountered member of this rather obscure family found in Europe. It is also by far the smallest orthopteran found in Western Europe, with its total adult length never exceeding 3.5 mm (0.14 in).

As with other members of the family, this insect lives its whole lifecycle as an inquiline within ants' nests. M. acervorum lives with ants (myrmecophily) of more than 20 species. This specialized way of life has led this insect to evolve many morphological differences compared to other orthopterans, including complete absence of wings (as they never leave their host nest) and hearing organs (as they no longer use stridulation), and much reduced eyesight, as well as their very small size.

These tiny insects are dark brown with paler bands and prominent cerci, which serve as their primary sensory organs. Adults are found throughout the year, and take up to two years to reach adulthood from hatching. In this species, the females reproduce parthenogenetically.

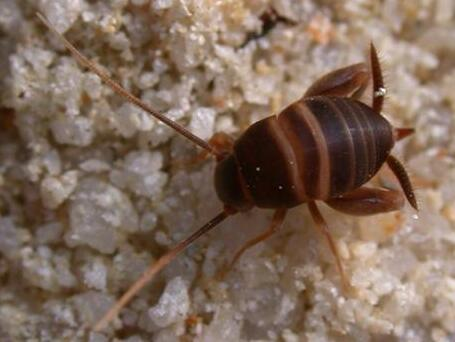
Adults, like this female, are wingless.

Video

== Myrmecophily ==
The species was one of the earliest myrmecophiles to be studied; its relationship with ants was first described by the Italian naturalist Paolo Savi in 1819. The species does not visually resemble an ant, but provides sufficient tactile, behavioural, and chemical cues to the ants to suppress their normal aggressive response to intruders, and to accept it in their colony.
