= Myrmecina silvangula =

Scientific classification
- Domain: Eukaryota
- Kingdom: Animalia
- Phylum: Arthropoda
- Class: Insecta
- Order: Hymenoptera
- Family: Formicidae
- Subfamily: Myrmicinae
- Genus: Myrmecina
- Species: M. silvangula

Binomial name
- Myrmecina silvangula Shattuck, 2009

Species of ant

Myrmecina silvangula is a species of ant in the family Formicidae.
