= Myrmecina silvampla =

Scientific classification
- Domain: Eukaryota
- Kingdom: Animalia
- Phylum: Arthropoda
- Class: Insecta
- Order: Hymenoptera
- Family: Formicidae
- Subfamily: Myrmicinae
- Genus: Myrmecina
- Species: M. silvampla

Binomial name
- Myrmecina silvampla Shattuck, 2009

Species of ant

Myrmecina silvampla is a species of ant in the family Formicidae.
