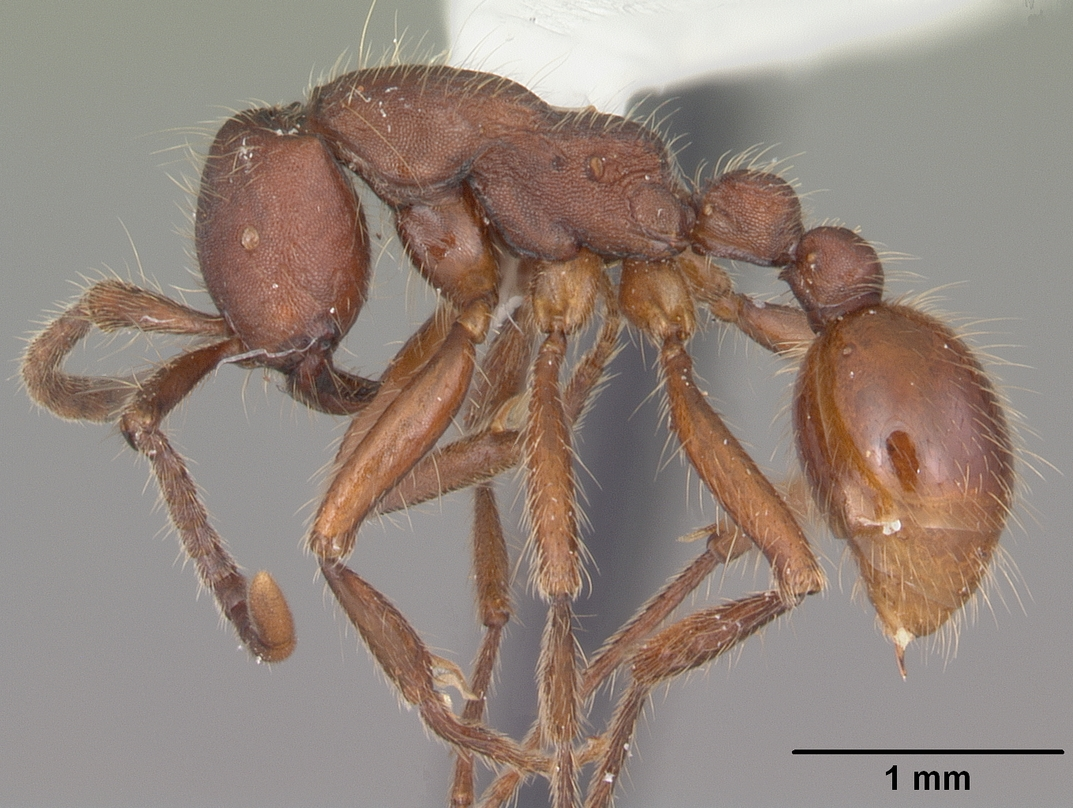

Scientific classification
- Kingdom: Animalia
- Phylum: Arthropoda
- Class: Insecta
- Order: Hymenoptera
- Family: Formicidae
- Subfamily: Dorylinae
- Genus: Neivamyrmex
- Species: N. texanus

Binomial name
- Neivamyrmex texanus Watkins, 1972

= Neivamyrmex texanus =

Species of ant

Neivamyrmex texanus is a species of army ant in the family Formicidae.
