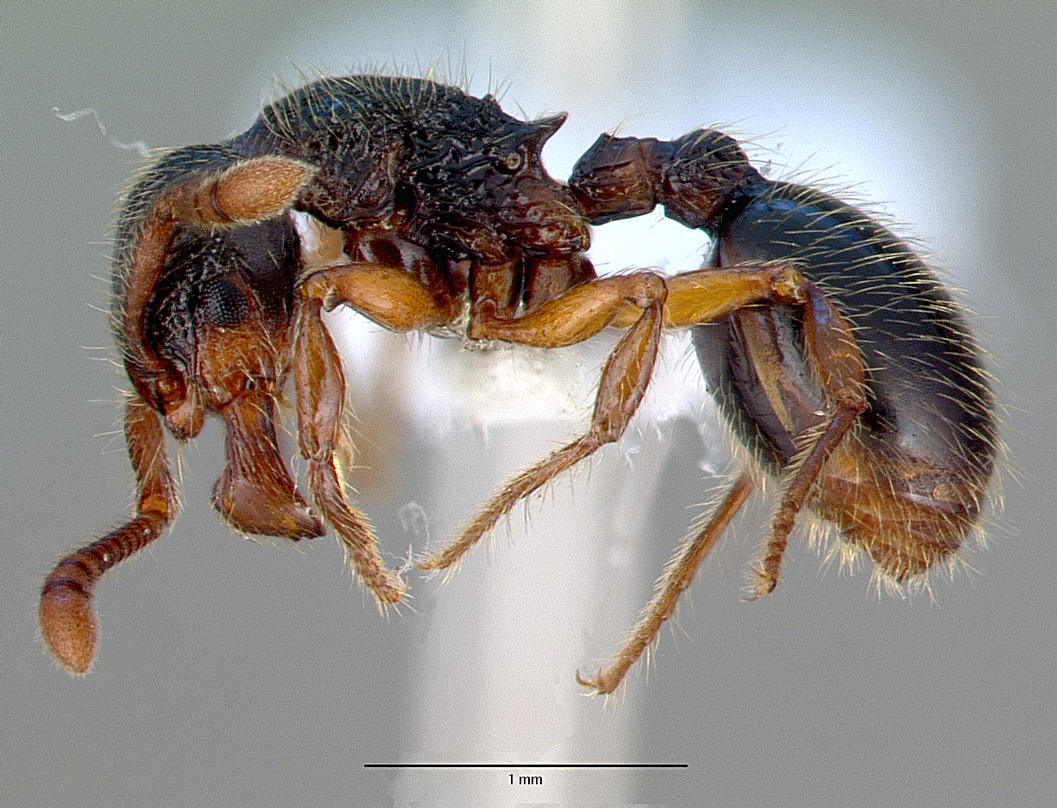
- Myrmecina graminicola worker from Japan

Scientific classification
- Domain: Eukaryota
- Kingdom: Animalia
- Phylum: Arthropoda
- Class: Insecta
- Order: Hymenoptera
- Family: Formicidae
- Subfamily: Myrmicinae
- Tribe: Crematogastrini
- Genus: Myrmecina; Curtis, 1829

Type species
- Myrmecina latreillii Mayr, 1855

Diversity
- 53 species

Synonyms
- Archaeomyrmex Mann, 1921

= Myrmecina =

Genus of ants

Myrmecina is a genus of ants in the subfamily Myrmicinae. It contains 53 species distributed in North America, Europe, northern Africa, India, Korea, Japan and Australia.

== Species ==
- Myrmecina alpina Shattuck, 2009
- Myrmecina amamiana Terayama, 1996
- Myrmecina americana Emery, 1895
- Myrmecina atlantis Santschi, 1939
- Myrmecina australis Wheeler & Wheeler, 1973
- Myrmecina bandarensis Forel, 1913
- Myrmecina bawai Punnath, Karunakaran, Dharma, 2021
- Myrmecina brevicornis Emery, 1897
- Myrmecina butteli Forel, 1913
- Myrmecina cacabau Mann, 1921
- Myrmecina curtisi Donisthorpe, 1949
- Myrmecina curvispina Zhou, Huang & Ma, 2008
- Myrmecina difficulta Shattuck, 2009
- Myrmecina eruga Shattuck, 2009
- Myrmecina flava Terayama, 1985
- Myrmecina graminicola (Latreille, 1802)
- Myrmecina guangxiensis Zhou, 2001
- Myrmecina hamula Zhou, Huang & Ma, 2008
- Myrmecina harrisoni Brown, 1967
- Myrmecina inaequala Shattuck, 2009
- Myrmecina kaigong Terayama, 2009
- Myrmecina magnificens Wong & Guénard, 2016
- Myrmecina mandibularis Viehmeyer, 1914
- Myrmecina mellonii Rigato, 1999
- Myrmecina modesta Mann, 1919
- Myrmecina nesaea Wheeler, 1924
- Myrmecina nipponica Wheeler, 1906
- Myrmecina opaciventris Emery, 1897
- Myrmecina pauca Huang, Huang & Zhou, 2008
- Myrmecina pilicornis Smith, 1858
- Myrmecina polita Emery, 1897
- Myrmecina pumila Shattuck, 2009
- Myrmecina punctata Emery, 1897
- Myrmecina raviwonghei Jaitrong, Samung, Waengsothorn & Okido, 2019
- Myrmecina reticulata Punnath, Karunakaran, Dharma, 2021
- Myrmecina rugosa Forel, 1902
- Myrmecina ryukyuensis Terayama, 1996
- Myrmecina sauteri Forel, 1912
- Myrmecina semipolita Forel, 1905
- Myrmecina sicula André, 1882
- Myrmecina silvalaeva Shattuck, 2009
- Myrmecina silvampla Shattuck, 2009
- Myrmecina silvangula Shattuck, 2009
- Myrmecina silvarugosa Shattuck, 2009
- Myrmecina silvatransversa Shattuck, 2009
- Myrmecina sinensis Wheeler, 1921
- Myrmecina striata Emery, 1889
- Myrmecina strigis Lin & Wu, 1998
- Myrmecina sulcata Emery, 1887
- Myrmecina taiwana Terayama, 1985
- Myrmecina transversa Emery, 1897
- Myrmecina undulata Emery, 1900
- Myrmecina urbanii Tiwari, 1994
- Myrmecina vidyae Tiwari, 1994
- Myrmecina wesselensis Shattuck, 2009
