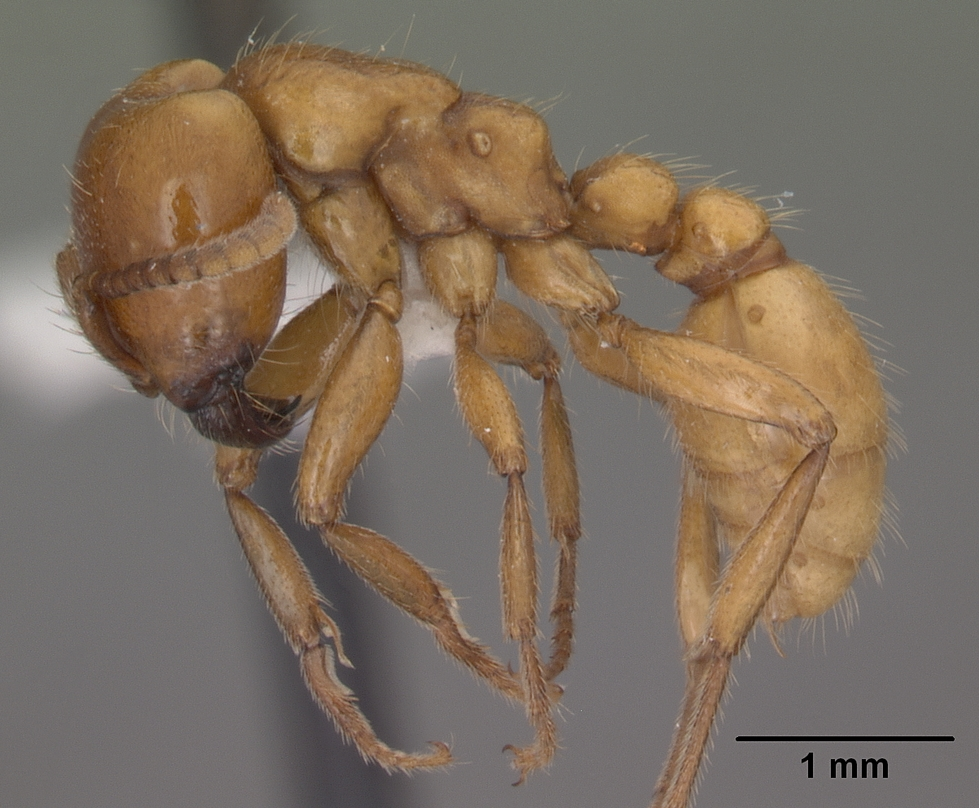

Scientific classification
- Kingdom: Animalia
- Phylum: Arthropoda
- Class: Insecta
- Order: Hymenoptera
- Family: Formicidae
- Subfamily: Dorylinae
- Genus: Neivamyrmex
- Species: N. swainsonii

Binomial name
- Neivamyrmex swainsonii (Shuckard, 1840)

= Neivamyrmex swainsonii =

Species of ant

Neivamyrmex swainsonii is a species of army ant in the family Formicidae.
