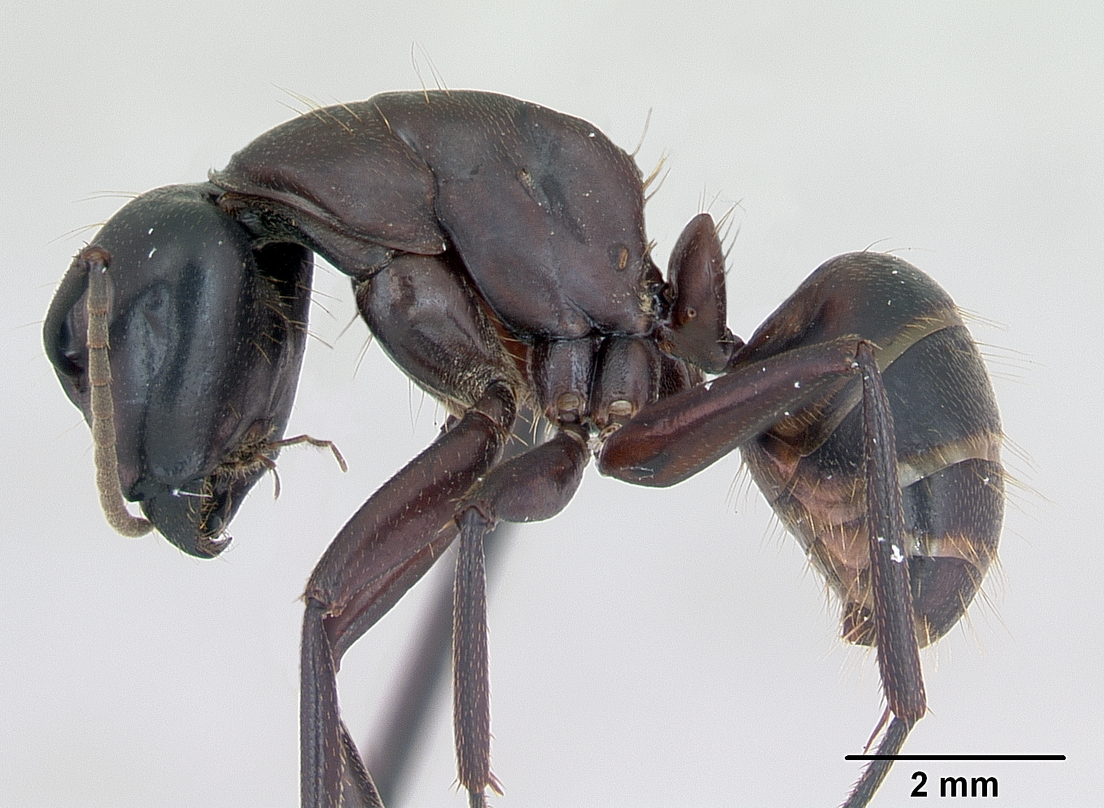
- Camponotus herculeanus worker

Scientific classification
- Kingdom: Animalia
- Phylum: Arthropoda
- Class: Insecta
- Order: Hymenoptera
- Family: Formicidae
- Subfamily: Formicinae
- Genus: Camponotus
- Species: C. herculeanus

Binomial name
- Camponotus herculeanus (Linnaeus, 1758)

= Camponotus herculeanus =

Species of ant known as the Hercules ant

Camponotus herculeanus (or Hercules ant) is a species of ant in the genus Camponotus, the carpenter ants, occurring in Northern Eurasia, from Norway to Eastern Siberia, and North America. First described as Formica herculeana by Linnaeus in 1758, the species was moved to Camponotus by Mayr in 1861.

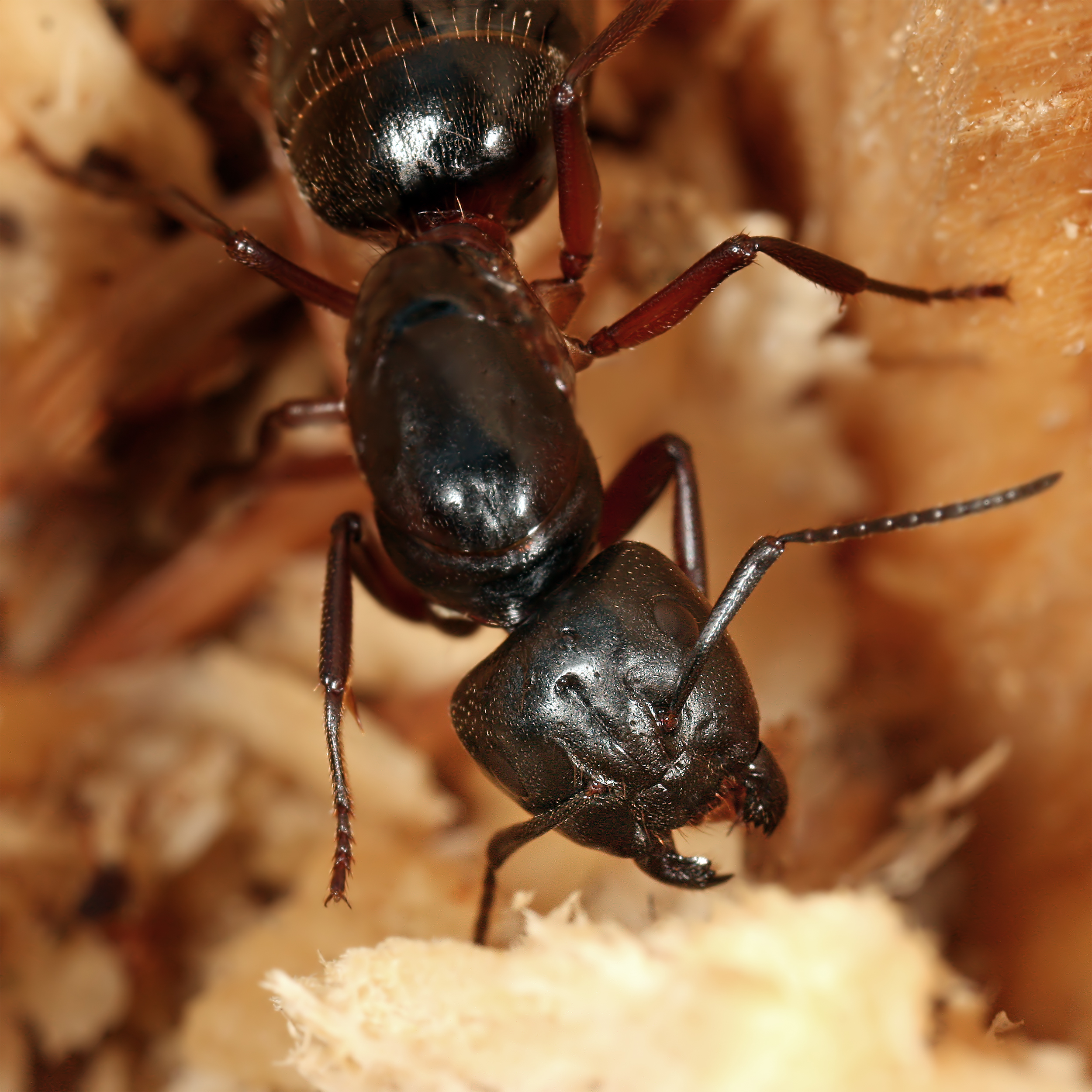
Head of a dealate queen

== Description ==
The colony of Camponotus herculeanus consists of one or several wingless females (queens), some fertile males, and three castes of sterile workers, known as majors, intermediates, and minors, in decreasing order of size. The queens are large, about 15 mm (0.6 in) in length, and are blackish in colour. The males are a similar colour but about half the size of the queens. The workers usually have blackish heads and gasters, and dark reddish-brown mesosomas, petioles and legs. In majors, the scapes (the long segments of the antenna, before the elbow) are shorter than the length of the head; in intermediates they are about the same length, and in minors, they extend well beyond the back of the head. The head and the dorsal surfaces of the mesosoma and gaster of the largest majors are bristly.

== Distribution and habitat ==
Camponotus herculeanus has a widespread distribution in the Northern Hemisphere, being present in most of Europe, Central and Northern Asia, Canada and the United States. It is common in mountainous regions and is the dominant ant species in mountainous and northerly parts of North America. It occupies a range of habitats including various types of conifer and hardwood forests, clearings, oak scrubland, disturbed areas, pastures and seashore grassland.

== Ecology ==
Nests of Camponotus herculeanus are built in timber, living or rotting trees, stumps, fallen logs and occasionally the structural timbers of buildings. The ants use their strong jaws to excavate galleries and chambers under the bark or in the wood, with a preference for damp wood or timber with fungal decay. In standing trees, their tunnels sometimes extend for 10 m (30 ft) above the ground. Satellite colonies, linked to the original nest by underground tunnels, may develop nearby, often in warmer, drier locations. These house older larvae, pupae, winged reproductives and workers, with the eggs and younger larvae remaining in the main nest.

A colony of Camponotus herculeanus contains several wingless females, which may be unrelated. Winged reproductives are produced in late summer and overwinter in the colony, emerging to fly in swarms on warm spring days. The workers become active in spring and forage in the vicinity of the nest. They tend aphids, and the larvae of the silvery blue butterfly (Glaucopsyche lygdamus), which often feeds on the lupine Lupinus bakeri. The diet consists of the honeydew produced by sap-sucking insects and the ants also consume any insect larvae that they encounter. The ant cricket Myrmecophilus pergandei sometimes lives in the colony, where it is tolerated by the ants.
