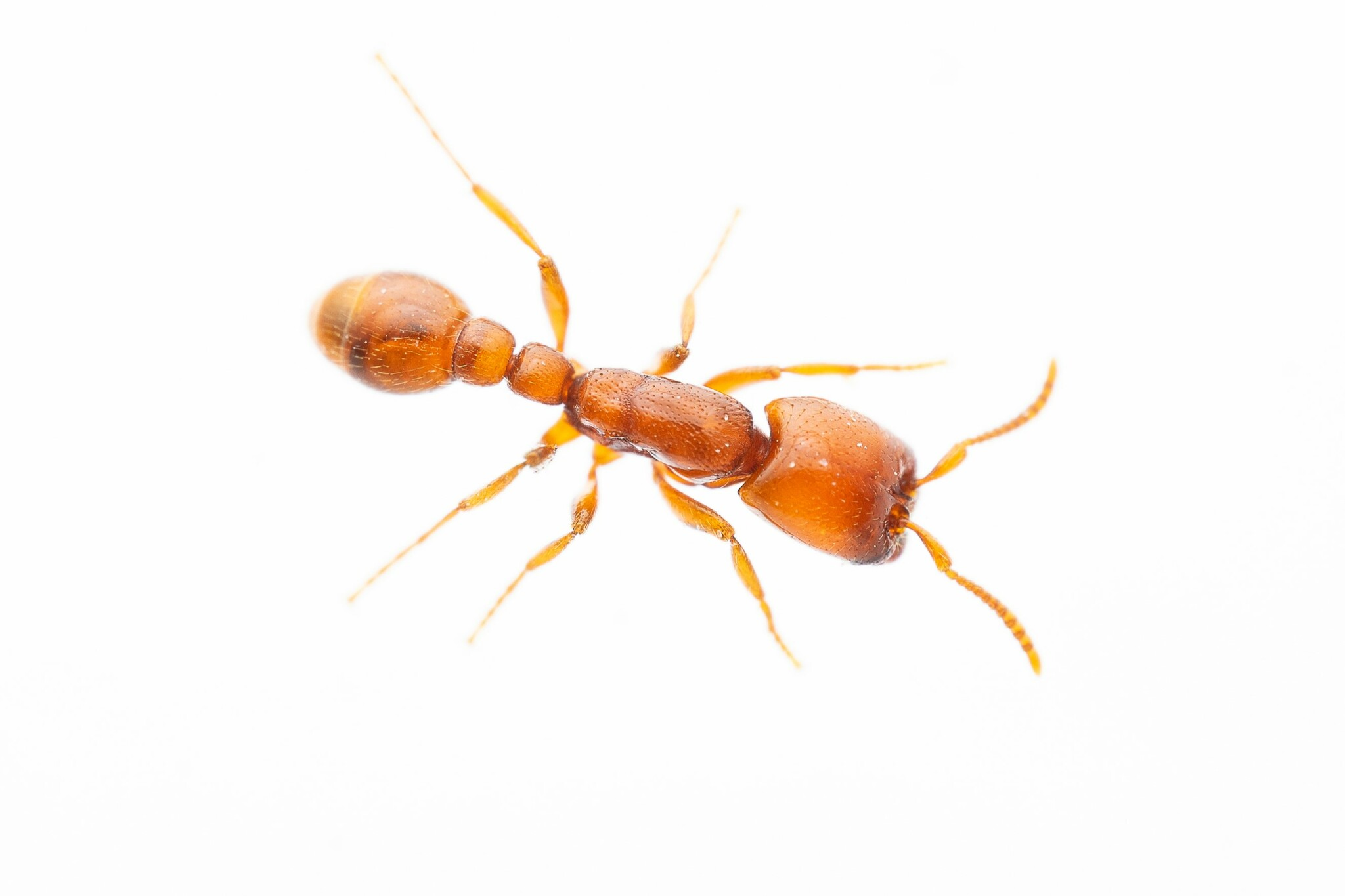
- Neivamyrmex leonardi

Scientific classification
- Kingdom: Animalia
- Phylum: Arthropoda
- Clade: Pancrustacea
- Class: Insecta
- Order: Hymenoptera
- Family: Formicidae
- Subfamily: Dorylinae
- Genus: Neivamyrmex; Borgmeier, 1940

Diversity
- 129 species

Synonyms
- Acamatus Emery, 1894; Woitkowskia Enzmann, 1952

= Neivamyrmex =

Genus of ants

Neivamyrmex is a genus of army ants in the subfamily Dorylinae.

== Range ==
Neivamyrmex species can be found from the central United States to southern Argentina.

== Taxonomy ==
As of 2021, 129 Neivamyrmex species have been identified. However, most research pertaining to this genus is based on a single species, Neivamyrmex nigriscens, from which knowledge about Neivamyrmex overall is derived. Many species are known based only on a small number of male individuals.

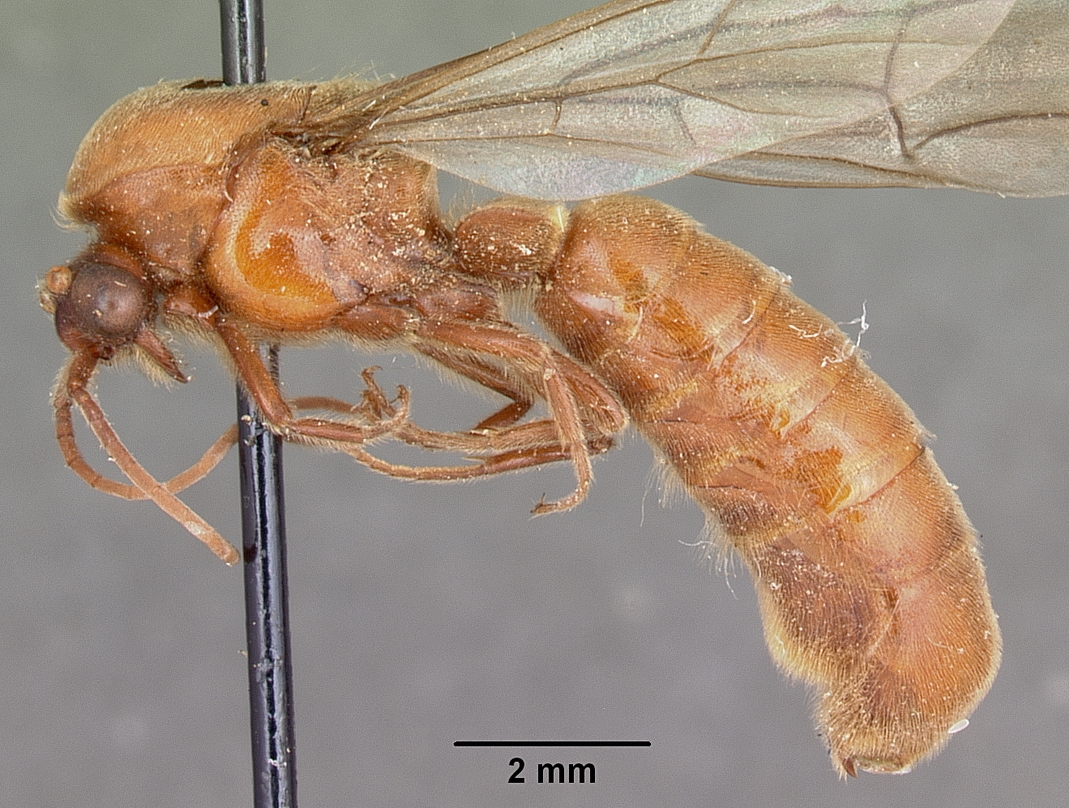
Neivamyrmex andrei male

== Biology ==
Neivamyrmex do not build permanent nests; instead, colonies are nomadic, establishing temporary bivouacs every night before moving on to a new location. Most species are predominantly subterranean, but they will occasionally forage above ground at night or on cloudy days. The larvae and pupae of other ant species are the principle food of Neivamyrmex, including ants of the genera Veromessor, Pheidole, Solenopsis, and Formica.

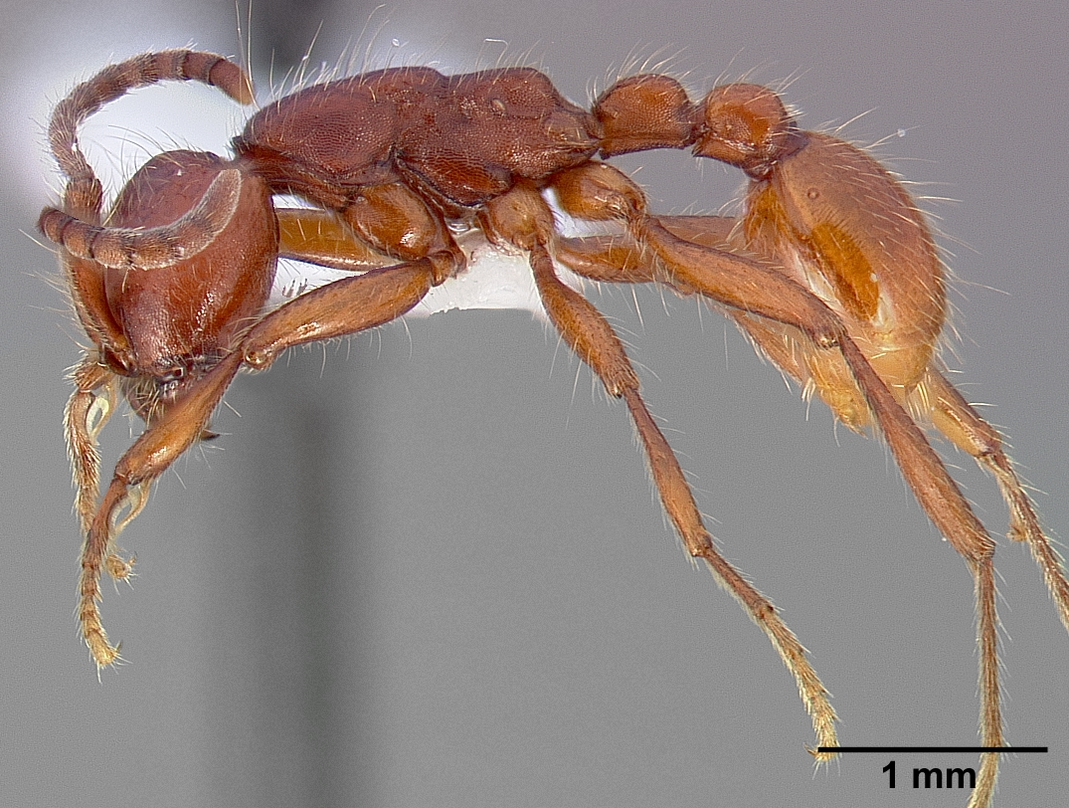
Neivamyrmex nigrescens worker

Male Neivamyrmex possess wings, while queens are flightless. Fertilization of queens may occur purely within the colony, with mating occurring between brothers and sisters, or unrelated males may fly in from foreign colonies to reproduce. After being fertilized, new queens will found new colonies by leaving their natal colonies alongside a large number of workers.

== Species ==
- Neivamyrmex adnepos (Wheeler, 1922)
- Neivamyrmex agilis Borgmeier, 1953
- Neivamyrmex albacorpus Varela Hernández & Castaño-Meneses, 2011
- Neivamyrmex alfaroi (Emery, 1890)
- Neivamyrmex andrei (Emery, 1901)
- Neivamyrmex angulimandibulatus Watkins, 1974
- Neivamyrmex angustinodis (Emery, 1888)
- Neivamyrmex antillanus (Forel, 1897)
- Neivamyrmex asper Borgmeier, 1955
- Neivamyrmex balzani (Emery, 1894)
- Neivamyrmex baylori Watkins, 1973
- Neivamyrmex bohlsi (Emery, 1896)
- Neivamyrmex bruchi (Forel, 1912)
- Neivamyrmex californicus (Mayr, 1870)
- Neivamyrmex carettei (Forel, 1913)
- Neivamyrmex carinifrons Borgmeier, 1953
- Neivamyrmex carolinensis (Emery, 1894)
- Neivamyrmex chamelensis Watkins, 1986
- Neivamyrmex clavifemur Borgmeier, 1953
- Neivamyrmex cloosae (Forel, 1912)
- Neivamyrmex compressinodis Borgmeier, 1953
- Neivamyrmex cornutus Watkins, 1975
- Neivamyrmex crassiscapus Watkins, 1990
- Neivamyrmex cratensis Borgmeier, 1953
- Neivamyrmex cristatus (André, 1889)
- Neivamyrmex curvinotus Watkins, 1994
- Neivamyrmex densepunctatus (Borgmeier, 1933)
- Neivamyrmex detectus Borgmeier, 1953
- Neivamyrmex diabolus (Forel, 1912)
- Neivamyrmex diana (Forel, 1912)
- Neivamyrmex digitistipus Watkins, 1975
- Neivamyrmex diversinodis (Borgmeier, 1933)
- Neivamyrmex dorbignii (Shuckard, 1840)
- †Neivamyrmex ectopus Wilson, 1985
- Neivamyrmex emersoni (Wheeler, 1921)
- Neivamyrmex emeryi (Santschi, 1921)
- Neivamyrmex enzmanni Özdikmen, 2010
- Neivamyrmex erichsonii (Westwood, 1842)
- Neivamyrmex falcifer (Emery, 1900)
- Neivamyrmex foveolatus Borgmeier, 1953
- Neivamyrmex fumosus (Forel, 1913)
- Neivamyrmex fuscipennis (Smith, 1942)
- Neivamyrmex genalis Borgmeier, 1953
- Neivamyrmex gibbatus Borgmeier, 1953
- Neivamyrmex goeldii (Forel, 1901)
- Neivamyrmex graciellae (Mann, 1926)
- Neivamyrmex gracilis Borgmeier, 1955
- Neivamyrmex gradualis Borgmeier, 1953
- Neivamyrmex guerinii (Shuckard, 1840)
- Neivamyrmex guyanensis (Santschi, 1916)
- Neivamyrmex halidaii (Shuckard, 1840)
- Neivamyrmex harrisii (Haldeman, 1852)
- Neivamyrmex hetschkoi (Mayr, 1886)
- Neivamyrmex hopei (Shuckard, 1840)
- Neivamyrmex humilis (Borgmeier, 1939)
- Neivamyrmex iheringi (Forel, 1908)
- Neivamyrmex imbellis (Emery, 1900)
- Neivamyrmex impudens (Mann, 1922)
- Neivamyrmex inca (Santschi, 1921)
- Neivamyrmex inflatus Borgmeier, 1958
- Neivamyrmex iridescens Borgmeier, 1950
- Neivamyrmex jerrmanni (Forel, 1901)
- Neivamyrmex kiowapache Snelling & Snelling, 2007
- Neivamyrmex klugii (Shuckard, 1840)
- Neivamyrmex kuertii (Enzmann, 1952)
- Neivamyrmex laevigatus (Borgmeier, 1948)
- Neivamyrmex latiscapus (Emery, 1901)
- Neivamyrmex legionis (Smith, 1855)
- Neivamyrmex leonardi (Wheeler, 1915)
- Neivamyrmex leptognathus (Emery, 1900)
- Neivamyrmex lieselae (Forel, 1913)
- Neivamyrmex longiscapus Borgmeier, 1953
- Neivamyrmex macrodentatus (Menozzi, 1931)
- Neivamyrmex mandibularis (Smith, 1942)
- Neivamyrmex manni (Wheeler, 1914)
- Neivamyrmex maroccanus (Santschi, 1926)
- Neivamyrmex maxillosus (Emery, 1900)
- Neivamyrmex megathrix Kempf, 1961
- Neivamyrmex melanocephalus (Emery, 1895)
- Neivamyrmex melshaemeri (Haldeman, 1852)
- Neivamyrmex micans Borgmeier, 1953
- Neivamyrmex microps Borgmeier, 1955
- Neivamyrmex minensis (Borgmeier, 1928)
- Neivamyrmex minor (Cresson, 1872)
- Neivamyrmex modestus (Borgmeier, 1933)
- Neivamyrmex mojave (Smith, 1943)
- Neivamyrmex moseri Watkins, 1969
- Neivamyrmex ndeh Snelling & Snelling, 2007
- Neivamyrmex nigrescens (Cresson, 1872)
- Neivamyrmex nordenskioldii (Holmgren, 1908)
- Neivamyrmex nyensis Watkins, 1977
- Neivamyrmex opacithorax (Emery, 1894)
- Neivamyrmex orthonotus (Borgmeier, 1933)
- Neivamyrmex pacificus Borgmeier, 1955
- Neivamyrmex pauxillus (Wheeler, 1903)
- Neivamyrmex perplexus Borgmeier, 1953
- Neivamyrmex pertii (Shuckard, 1840)
- Neivamyrmex physognathus (Emery, 1900)
- Neivamyrmex pilosus (Smith, 1858)
- Neivamyrmex piraticus Borgmeier, 1953
- Neivamyrmex planidens Borgmeier, 1953
- Neivamyrmex planidorsus (Emery, 1906)
- Neivamyrmex postangustatus (Borgmeier, 1934)
- Neivamyrmex postcarinatus Borgmeier, 1953
- Neivamyrmex pseudops (Forel, 1909)
- Neivamyrmex puerulus Borgmeier, 1955
- Neivamyrmex pulchellus Borgmeier, 1955
- Neivamyrmex pullus Borgmeier, 1953
- Neivamyrmex punctaticeps (Emery, 1894)
- Neivamyrmex quadratoocciputus Watkins, 1975
- Neivamyrmex radoszkowskii (Emery, 1900)
- Neivamyrmex raptor (Forel, 1911)
- Neivamyrmex romandii (Shuckard, 1840)
- Neivamyrmex rosenbergi (Forel, 1911)
- Neivamyrmex rugulosus Borgmeier, 1953
- Neivamyrmex scutellaris Borgmeier, 1953
- Neivamyrmex shuckardi (Emery, 1900)
- Neivamyrmex spatulatus (Borgmeier, 1939)
- Neivamyrmex spoliator (Forel, 1899)
- Neivamyrmex sulcatus (Mayr, 1868)
- Neivamyrmex sumichrasti (Norton, 1868)
- Neivamyrmex swainsonii (Shuckard, 1840)
- Neivamyrmex tenuis Borgmeier, 1953
- Neivamyrmex texanus Watkins, 1972
- Neivamyrmex tristis (Forel, 1901)
- Neivamyrmex vicinus Borgmeier, 1953
- Neivamyrmex walkerii (Westwood, 1842)
- Neivamyrmex wilsoni Snelling & Snelling, 2007
