= Myrmecina bawai =

Scientific classification
- Domain: Eukaryota
- Kingdom: Animalia
- Phylum: Arthropoda
- Class: Insecta
- Order: Hymenoptera
- Family: Formicidae
- Subfamily: Myrmicinae
- Genus: Myrmecina
- Species: M. bawai

Binomial name
- Myrmecina bawai Punnath, Karunakaran, Dharma, 2021

Species of ant

Myrmecina bawai is a species of ant in the family Formicidae.

== Distribution and habitat ==
This species has been observed in the Indian state of Mizoram. They reside on the forest floor of the eastern Himalayan hills in small colonies of 30 to 150 individuals. They are found under rocks, fallen trees, and leaves.

== Etymology ==
This species is named after professor Kamaljit S. Bawa.
