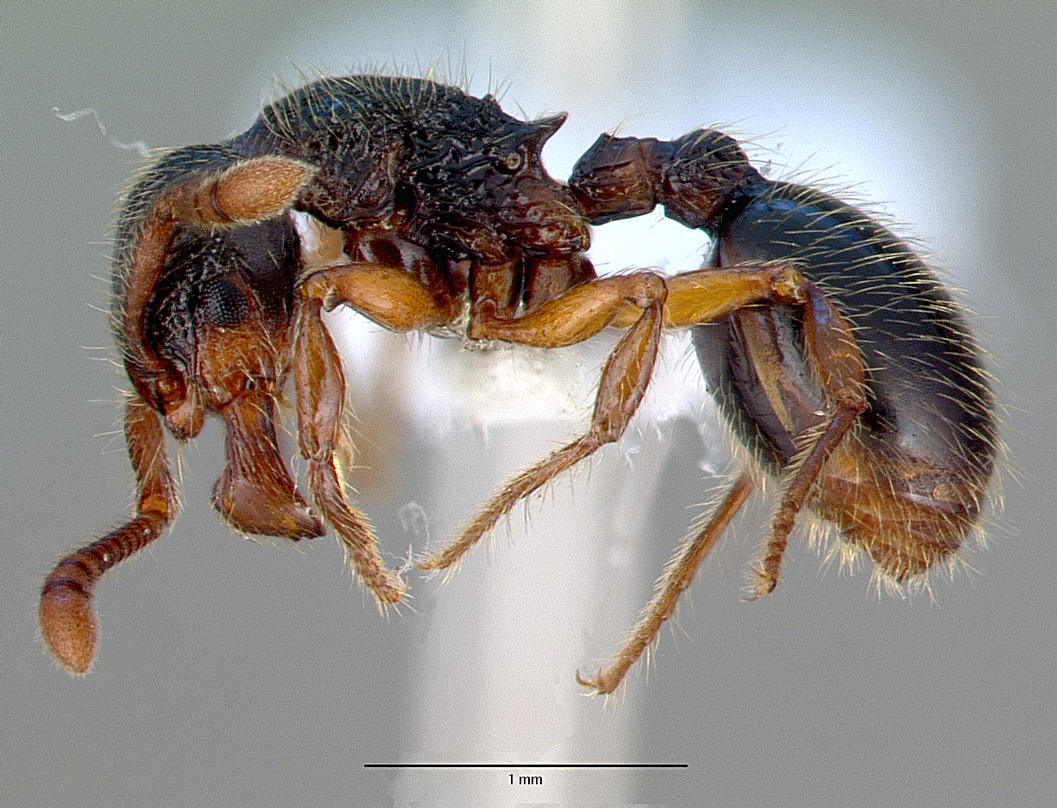

Scientific classification
- Kingdom: Animalia
- Phylum: Arthropoda
- Clade: Pancrustacea
- Class: Insecta
- Order: Hymenoptera
- Family: Formicidae
- Subfamily: Myrmicinae
- Genus: Myrmecina
- Species: M. graminicola

Binomial name
- Myrmecina graminicola (Latreille, 1802)

Subspecies
- M. g. graminicola M. g. oelandica M. g. nipponica M. g. gotlandica M. g. atlantis M. g. sinensis M. g. dentata

Synonyms
- Formica graminicola Latreille, 1802; Myrmicina graminicola Latreille, 1802

= Myrmecina graminicola =

Species of ant

Myrmecina graminicola is a species of ant found throughout Northern Africa, Europe, Asia, and elsewhere in the Palearctic realm. Its colonies build nests in soil, under rocks, and in leaf litter. It was described in 1802 by Pierre André Latreille, initially in the genus Formica. They are not an aggressive species. When a worker encounters an intruder, it starts to play dead with its legs and antennae folded. They live in colonies that have less than 100 workers and one queen. Before mating, the female ant releases a pheromone that the male ant is attracted to this and the mating then occurs seconds after. The ant colonies move around following the queen's pheromone trail.

Male Myrmecina graminicola ants have been observed flying at high elevations (between 5 and 20 meters above the ground) during their mating flights, which is unusual for a species that normally nests and forages near the soil surface. Recent research has also identified several distinctive morphological traits in males, including a small hook-shaped structure on the dorsum and the absence of spurs on the middle and hind legs, features that help differentiate them from other species within the same genus.
