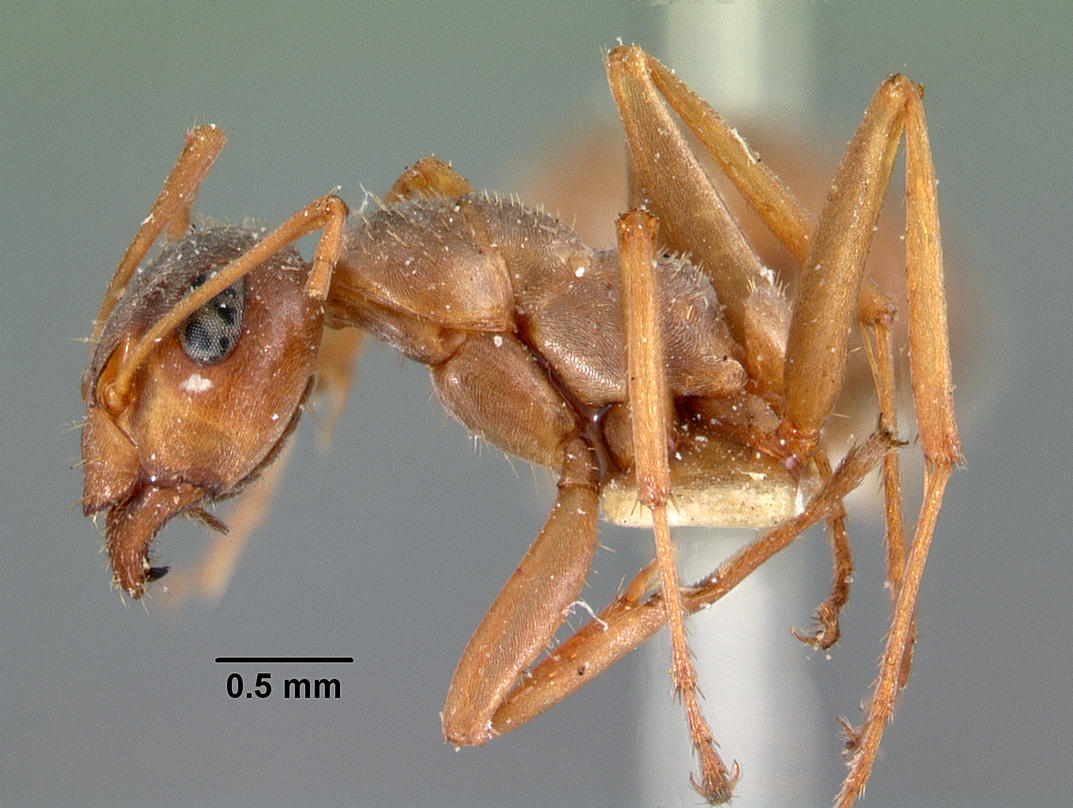

Scientific classification
- Domain: Eukaryota
- Kingdom: Animalia
- Phylum: Arthropoda
- Class: Insecta
- Order: Hymenoptera
- Family: Formicidae
- Subfamily: Formicinae
- Genus: Formica
- Species: F. montana

Binomial name
- Formica montana Wheeler, 1910

= Formica montana =

Species of ant

Formica montana is an ant in the genus Formica (wood ants, mound ants, and field ants) in the family Formicidae. A common name for F. montana is "prairie mound ant".

F. montana are often polygynous, a single colony can have as many as 20 queens present.
