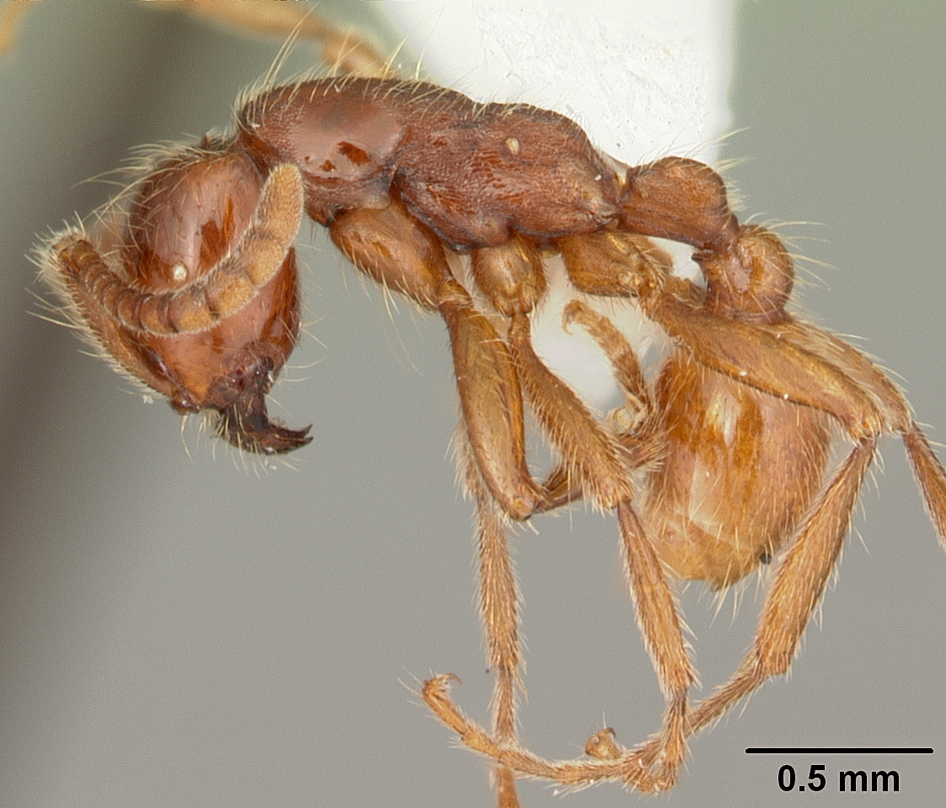

Scientific classification
- Kingdom: Animalia
- Phylum: Arthropoda
- Class: Insecta
- Order: Hymenoptera
- Family: Formicidae
- Genus: Neivamyrmex
- Species: N. opacithorax

Binomial name
- Neivamyrmex opacithorax (Emery, 1894)

= Neivamyrmex opacithorax =

Species of ant

Neivamyrmex opacithorax is a species of army ant in the family Formicidae.
