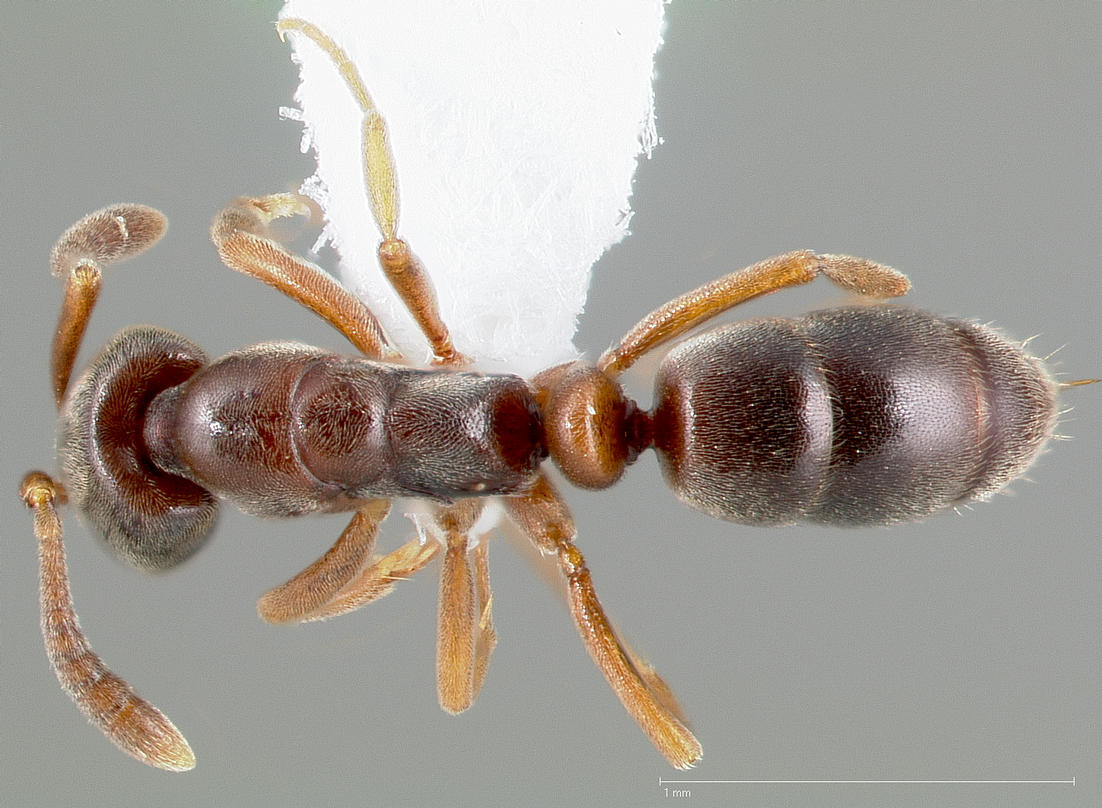

Scientific classification
- Domain: Eukaryota
- Kingdom: Animalia
- Phylum: Arthropoda
- Class: Insecta
- Order: Hymenoptera
- Family: Formicidae
- Genus: Hypoponera
- Species: H. opacior

Binomial name
- Hypoponera opacior (Forel, 1893)

= Hypoponera opacior =

Species of ant

Hypoponera opacior is a species of ant in the family Formicidae.

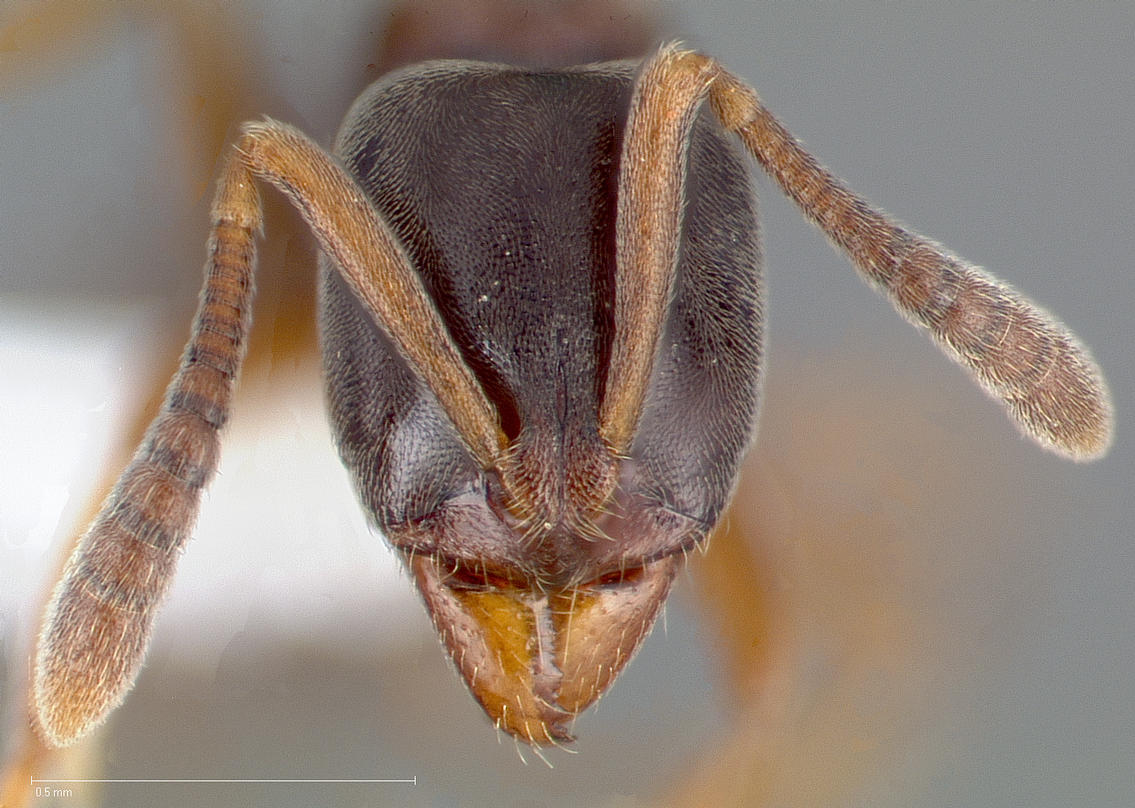
Ponerine ant, Hypoponera opacior

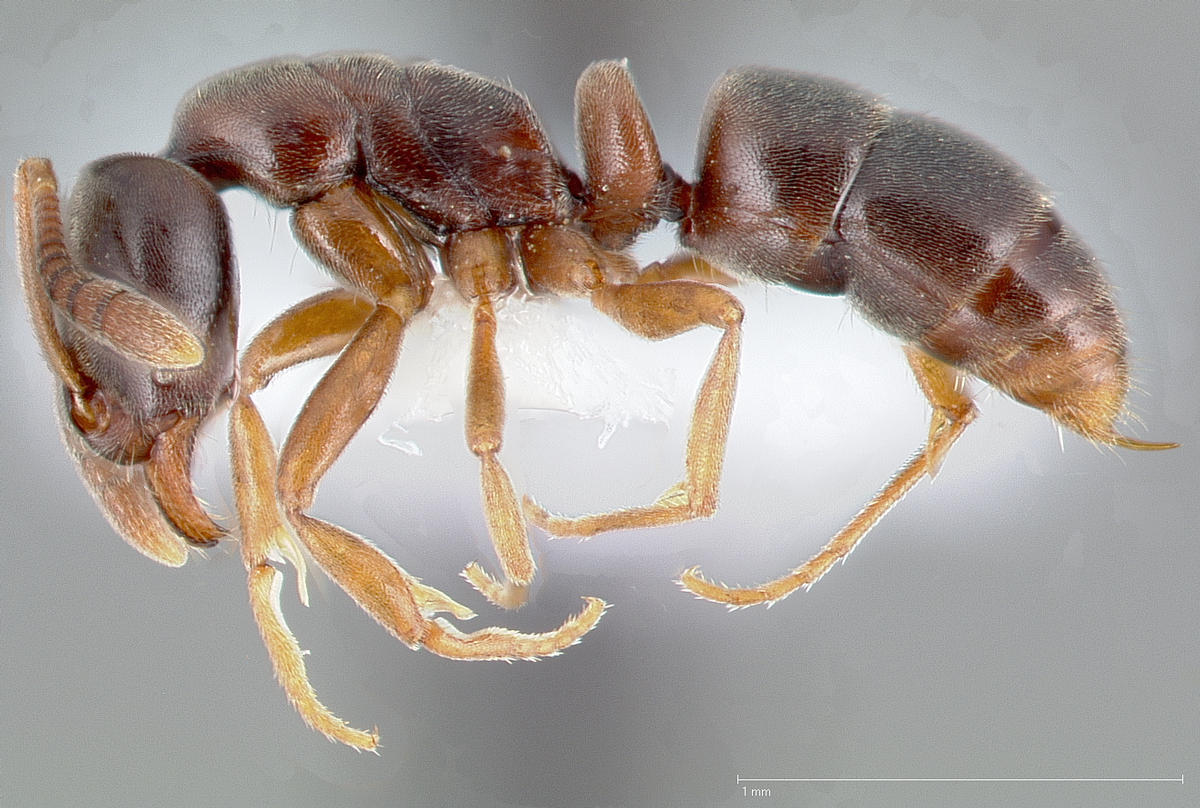
Ponerine ant, Hypoponera opacior
