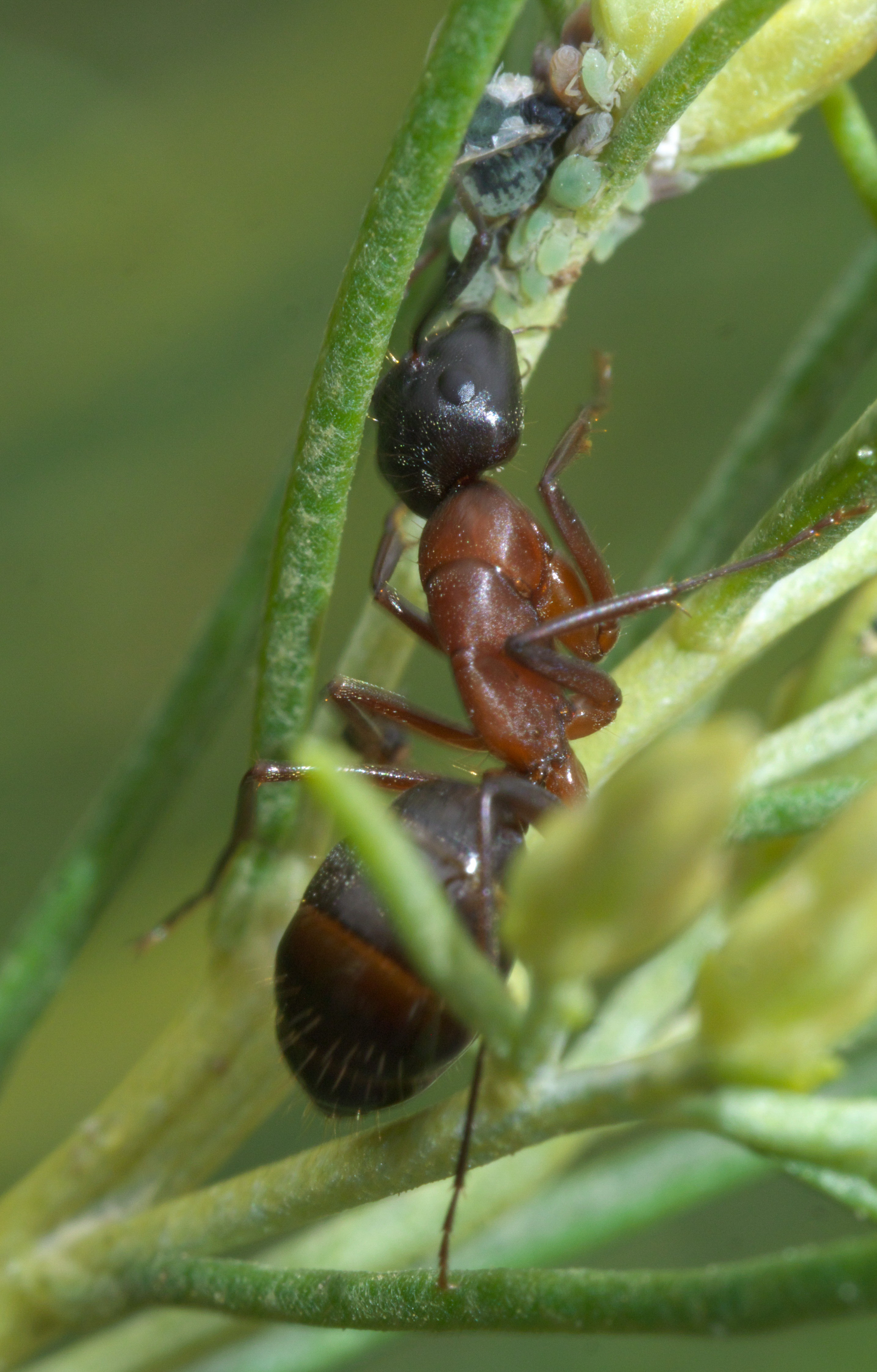

Scientific classification
- Kingdom: Animalia
- Phylum: Arthropoda
- Clade: Pancrustacea
- Class: Insecta
- Order: Hymenoptera
- Family: Formicidae
- Subfamily: Formicinae
- Genus: Camponotus
- Subgenus: Tanaemyrmex
- Species: C. vicinus

Binomial name
- Camponotus vicinus Mayr, 1870

= Camponotus vicinus =

Species of ant

Camponotus vicinus is a species of carpenter ant widespread throughout western North America; it is found from Alaska, south to Mexico, and east to Texas and Manitoba. Unlike its wood-nesting relatives, C. vicinus is typically found nesting in the soil under stones and other objects.

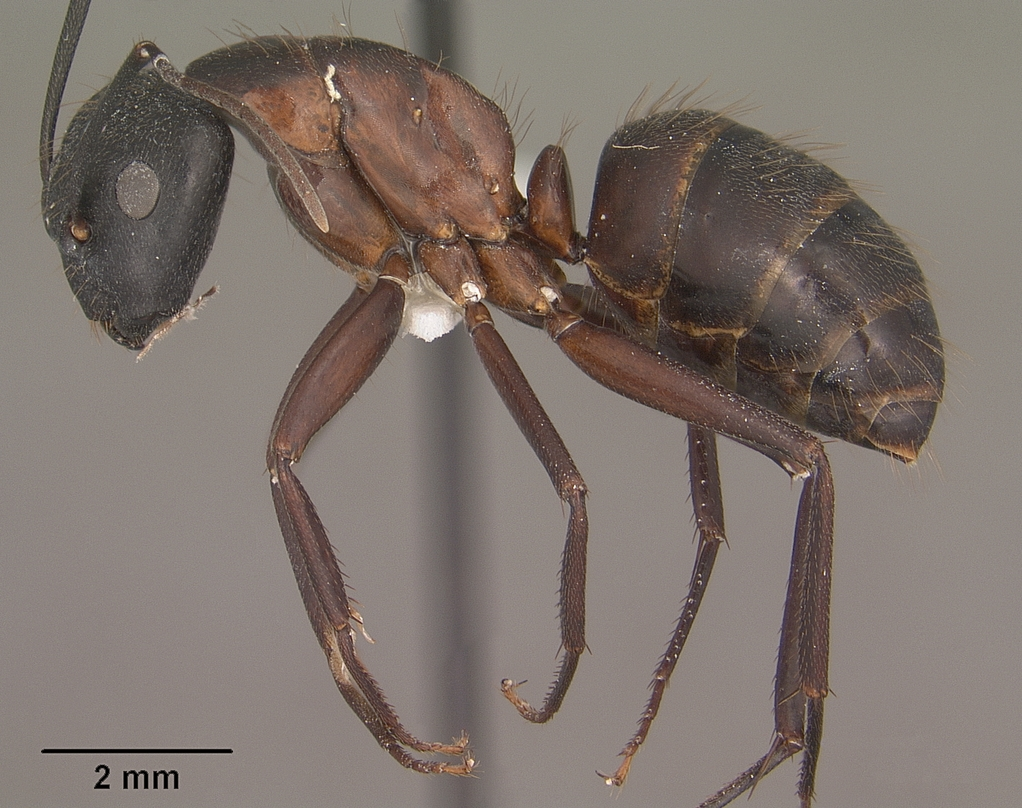
antweb.org specimen
