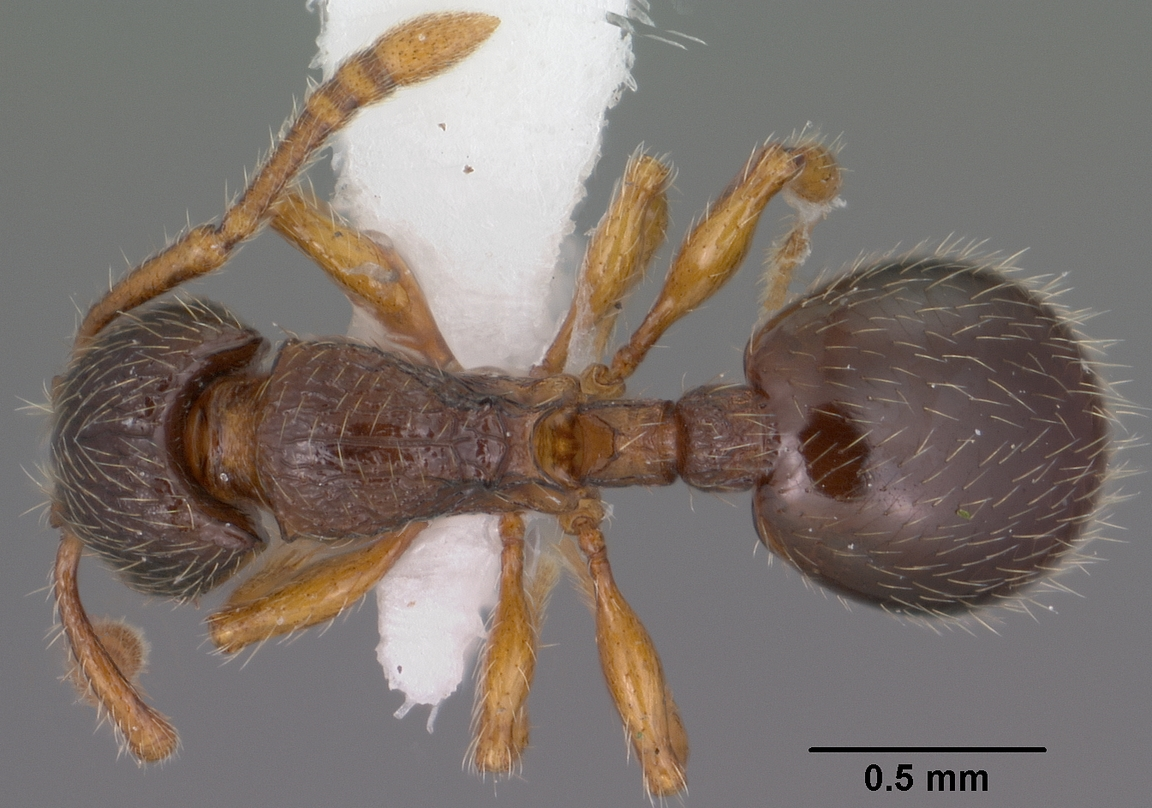

Scientific classification
- Kingdom: Animalia
- Phylum: Arthropoda
- Clade: Pancrustacea
- Class: Insecta
- Order: Hymenoptera
- Family: Formicidae
- Subfamily: Myrmicinae
- Genus: Myrmecina
- Species: M. americana

Binomial name
- Myrmecina americana Emery, 1895

= Myrmecina americana =

Species of ant

Myrmecina americana is a species of ant in the family Formicidae.

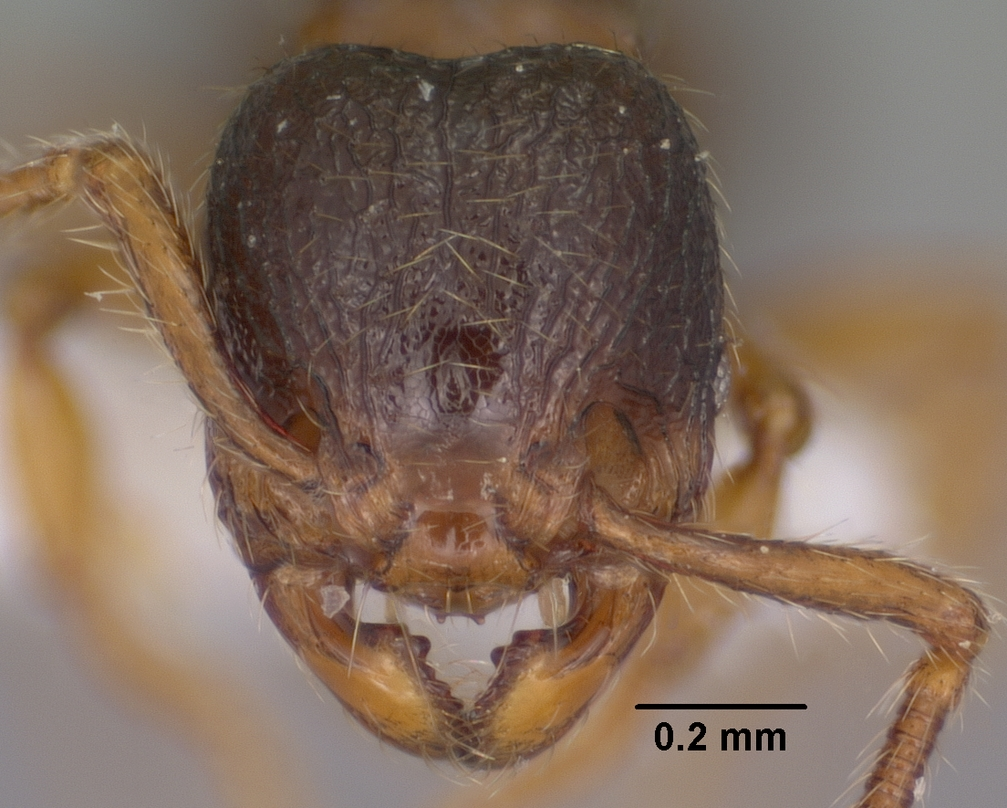

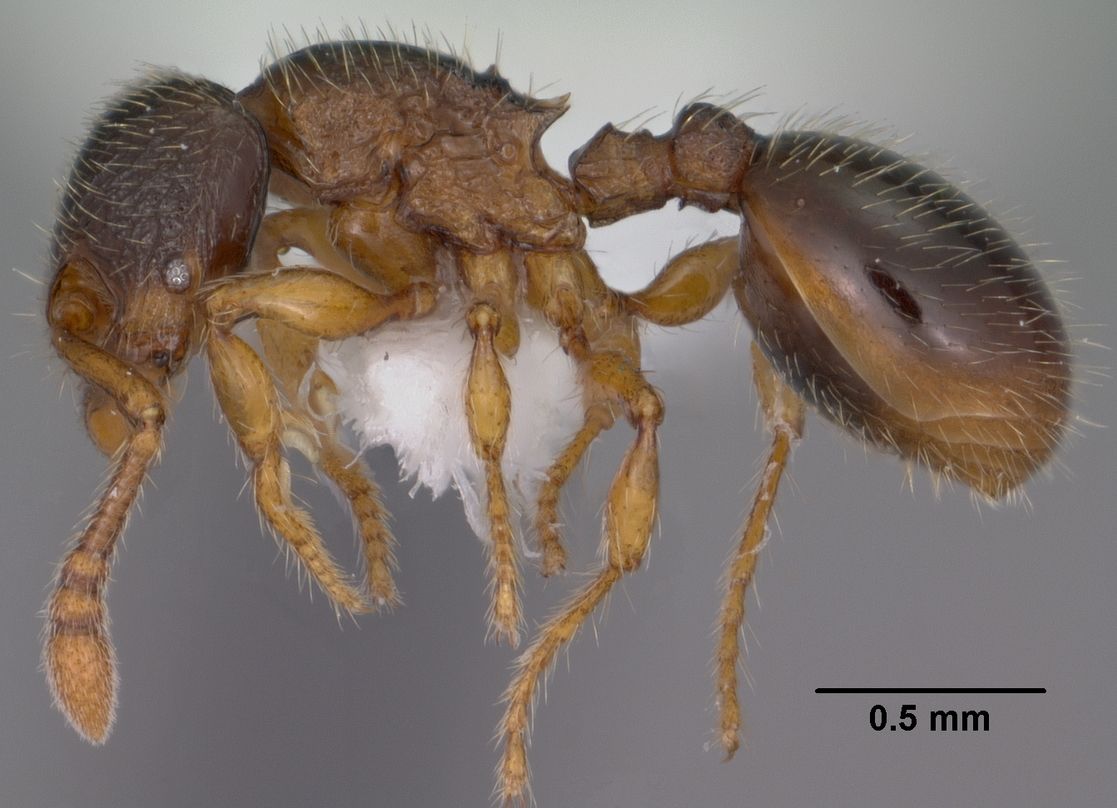
