= Crematogaster punctulata =

Scientific classification
- Domain: Eukaryota
- Kingdom: Animalia
- Phylum: Arthropoda
- Class: Insecta
- Order: Hymenoptera
- Family: Formicidae
- Subfamily: Myrmicinae
- Genus: Crematogaster
- Species: C. punctulata

Binomial name
- Crematogaster punctulata Emery, 1895

Species of ant

Crematogaster punctulata is a species of ant in the family Formicidae.
