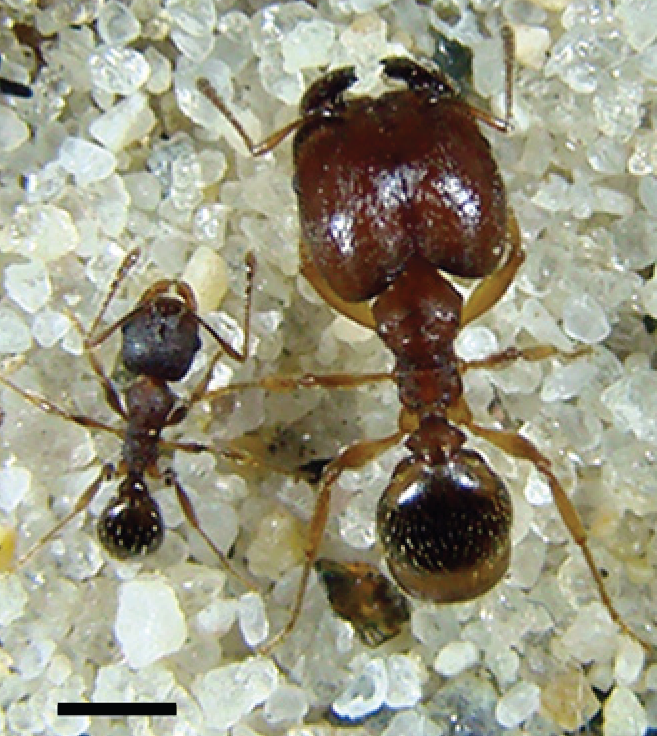

Scientific classification
- Kingdom: Animalia
- Phylum: Arthropoda
- Class: Insecta
- Order: Hymenoptera
- Family: Formicidae
- Subfamily: Myrmicinae
- Tribe: Attini
- Genus: Pheidole
- Species: P. pilifera

Binomial name
- Pheidole pilifera (Roger, 1863)

= Pheidole pilifera =

Species of ant

Pheidole pilifera is a species of ant and a higher myrmicine in the family Formicidae.

== Subspecies ==
These four subspecies belong to the species Pheidole pilifera:

- Pheidole pilifera artemisia Cole, 1933^{i c g}
- Pheidole pilifera coloradensis Emery, 1895^{i c g}
- Pheidole pilifera pacifica Wheeler, 1915^{i c g}
- Pheidole pilifera pilifera (Roger, 1863)^{i c g}

Data sources: i = ITIS, c = Catalogue of Life, g = GBIF, b = Bugguide.net
