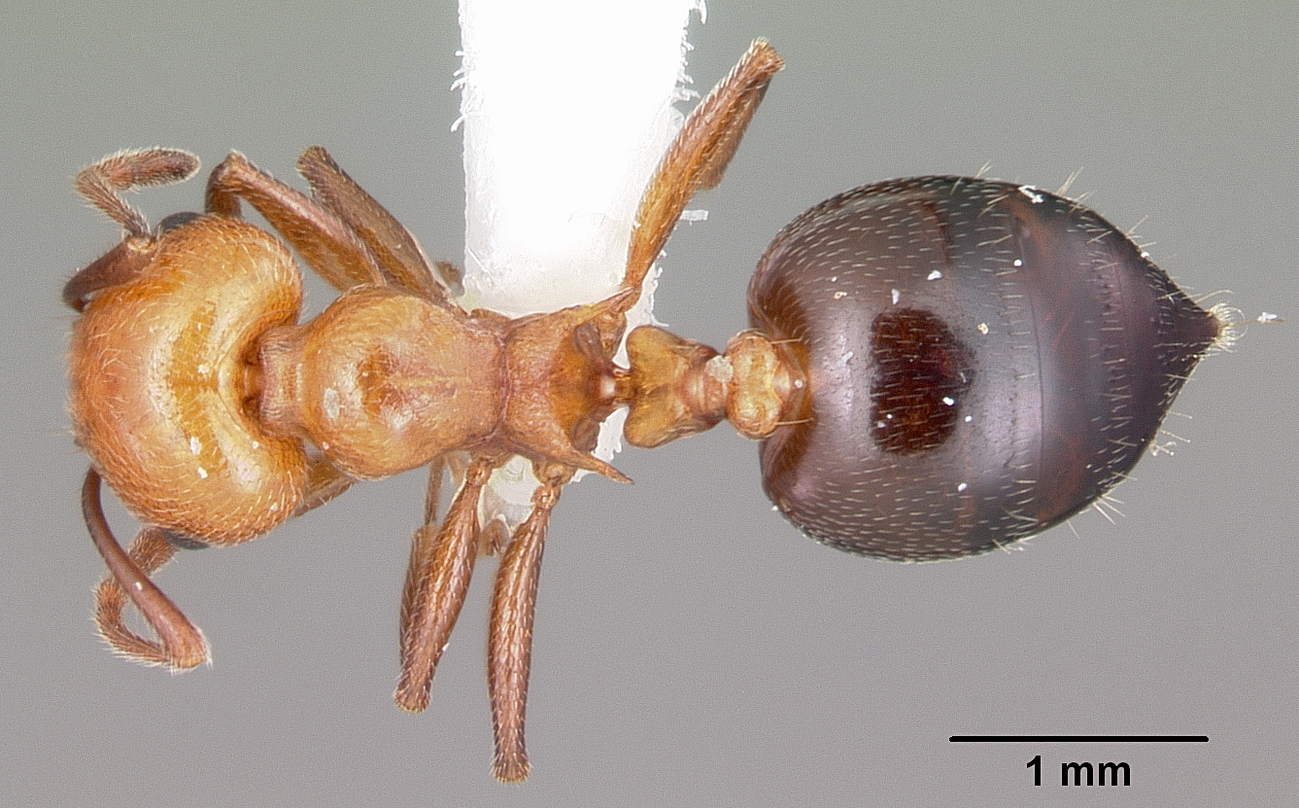

Scientific classification
- Domain: Eukaryota
- Kingdom: Animalia
- Phylum: Arthropoda
- Class: Insecta
- Order: Hymenoptera
- Family: Formicidae
- Subfamily: Myrmicinae
- Genus: Crematogaster
- Species: C. laeviuscula

Binomial name
- Crematogaster laeviuscula Mayr, 1870

= Crematogaster laeviuscula =

Species of ant

Crematogaster laeviuscula, known generally as the acrobat ant or valentine ant, is a species of ant in the family Formicidae.

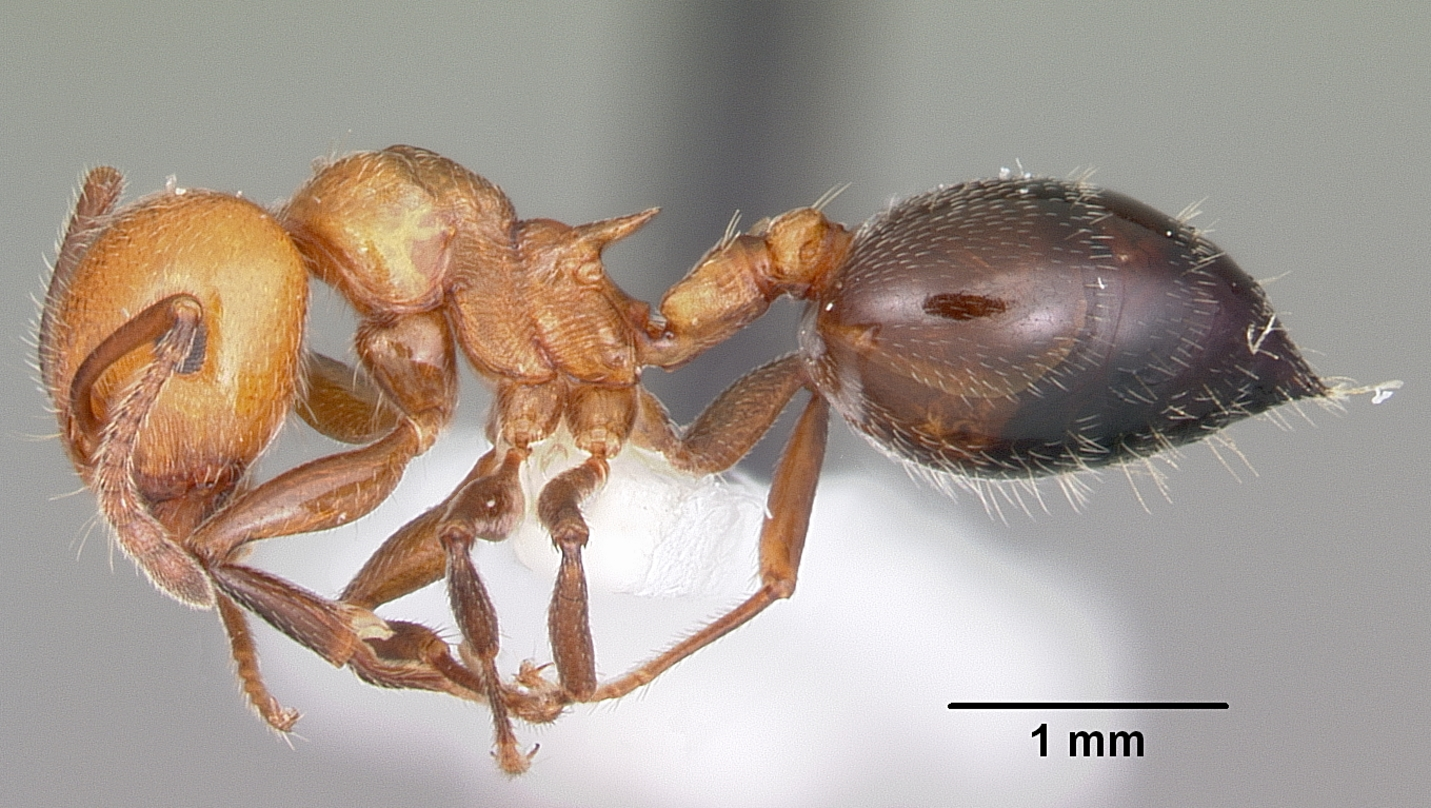
Acrobat ant, Crematogaster laeviuscula
