= Lucien Chopard =

French entomologist

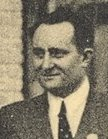
L. Chopard at the International Congress of Entomology in Madrid, 1935

Lucien Chopard (Paris, 31 August 1885 – 16 November 1971) was a French entomologist.

He graduated as a doctor of science in 1920 at the Faculté des sciences de Paris with his thesis Recherches sur la conformation et le développement des derniers segments abdominaux chez les orthoptères. After being named a correspondent of the Muséum national d'histoire naturelle in 1919 he entered that institution in 1931 working in the laboratoire d’entomologie, where he was in charge of the vivarium. He became the sous directeur in 1936, then a professor in 1951. He retired in 1955.

Chopard was a specialist in Orthoptera. He worked on Mantidae collected by Charles A. Alluaud and René Gabriel Jeannel on their East Africa expedition (1911–1912).

He became a member of the Société entomologique de France in 1901 and was distinguished by being made secrétaire général honoraire in 1950. He translated the work of Vincent Brian Wigglesworth, Physiologie des insectes (Dunond, Paris, 1959), into French. In 1931 he was made president of the Société zoologique de France.

== Partial list of publications ==
- Faune de France. 3, Orthoptères et dermaptères (Paul Lechevalier, Paris)(1922). Includes earwigs.
- Note sur les orthoptères cavernicoles du Tonkin, Bulletin de la Société zoologique de France, LIV : 424–438 (1929).
- La biologie des orthoptères (Paul Lechevalier, Paris)(1938).
- with Jacques Berlioz (1891–1975), Léon Bertin (1896–1954) et P. Laurent, Les Migrations animales (Gallimard, Paris) (1942).
- Orthoptéroïdes de l'Afrique du Nord (Larose, Paris) (1943).
- La Vie des sauterelles (Gallimard, Paris) (1945).
- Atlas des aptérygotes et orthoptéroïdes de France (Boubée, Paris) (1947).
- Atlas des libellules de France, Belgique, Suisse (Boubée, Paris) (1948). On dragonflies.
- Le Mimétisme, les colorations animales, dissimulation des formes et déguisements, ressemblances mimétiques (Payot, Paris) (1949).
- Faune de France. 56, Orthoptéroïdes (Paul Lechevalier, Paris) (1951).
- Orthopterorum catalogus. Pars 10, Grillides : fam. Gryllidae, subfam. Gryllinae (W. Junk, s'-Gravenhage) (1967).
