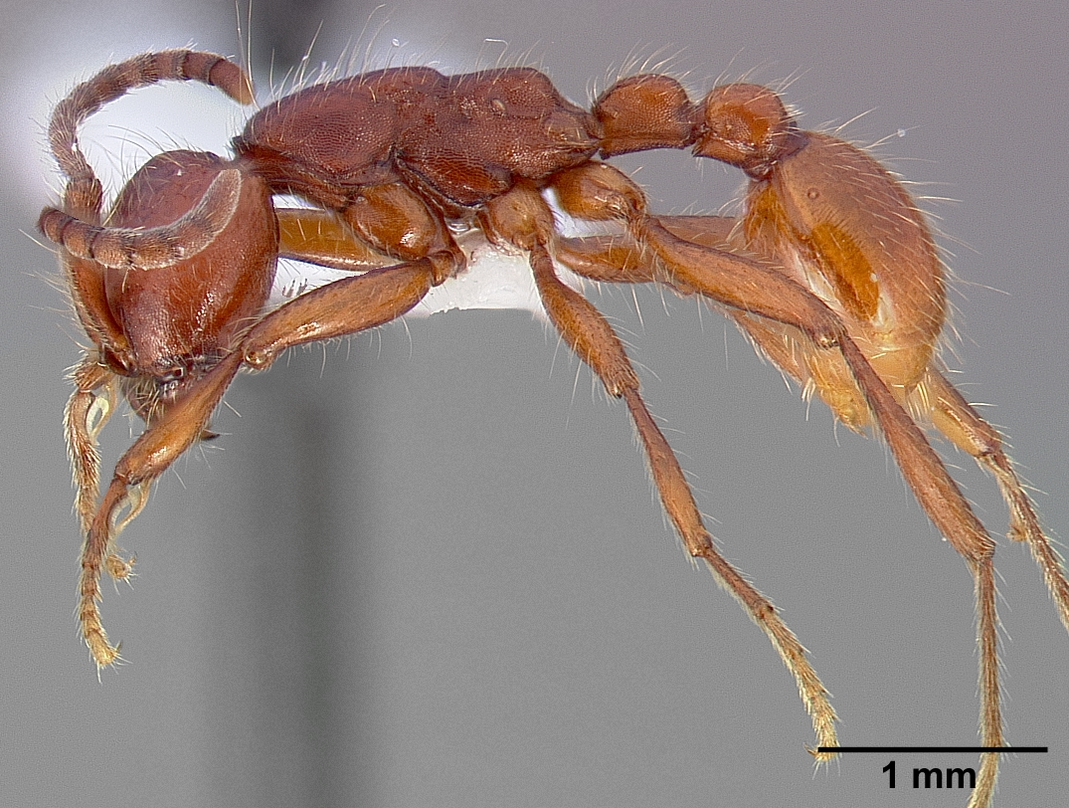
- Neivamyrmex nigrescens worker

Scientific classification
- Domain: Eukaryota
- Kingdom: Animalia
- Phylum: Arthropoda
- Class: Insecta
- Order: Hymenoptera
- Family: Formicidae
- Genus: Neivamyrmex
- Species: N. nigrescens

Binomial name
- Neivamyrmex nigrescens (Cresson, 1872)

Synonyms
- Labidus nigrescens Cresson, 1872; Neivamyrmex schmitti (Emery, 1894)

= Neivamyrmex nigrescens =

Species of ant

Neivamyrmex nigrescens is a North American species of army ant in the genus Neivamyrmex. The species is found in the United States and Mexico, and is the most widely distributed Neivamyrmex species in the United States. Due to its wide range, it has become the most studied and well-known species in its genus.
