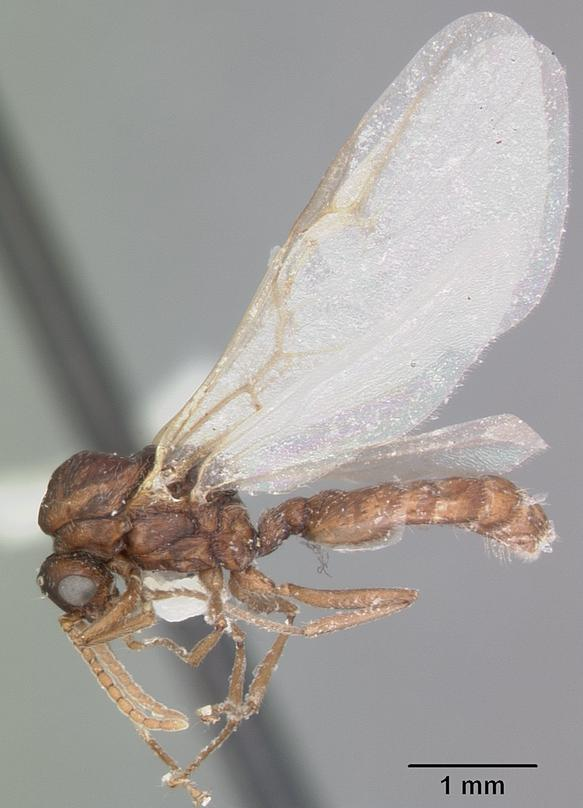
- profile view
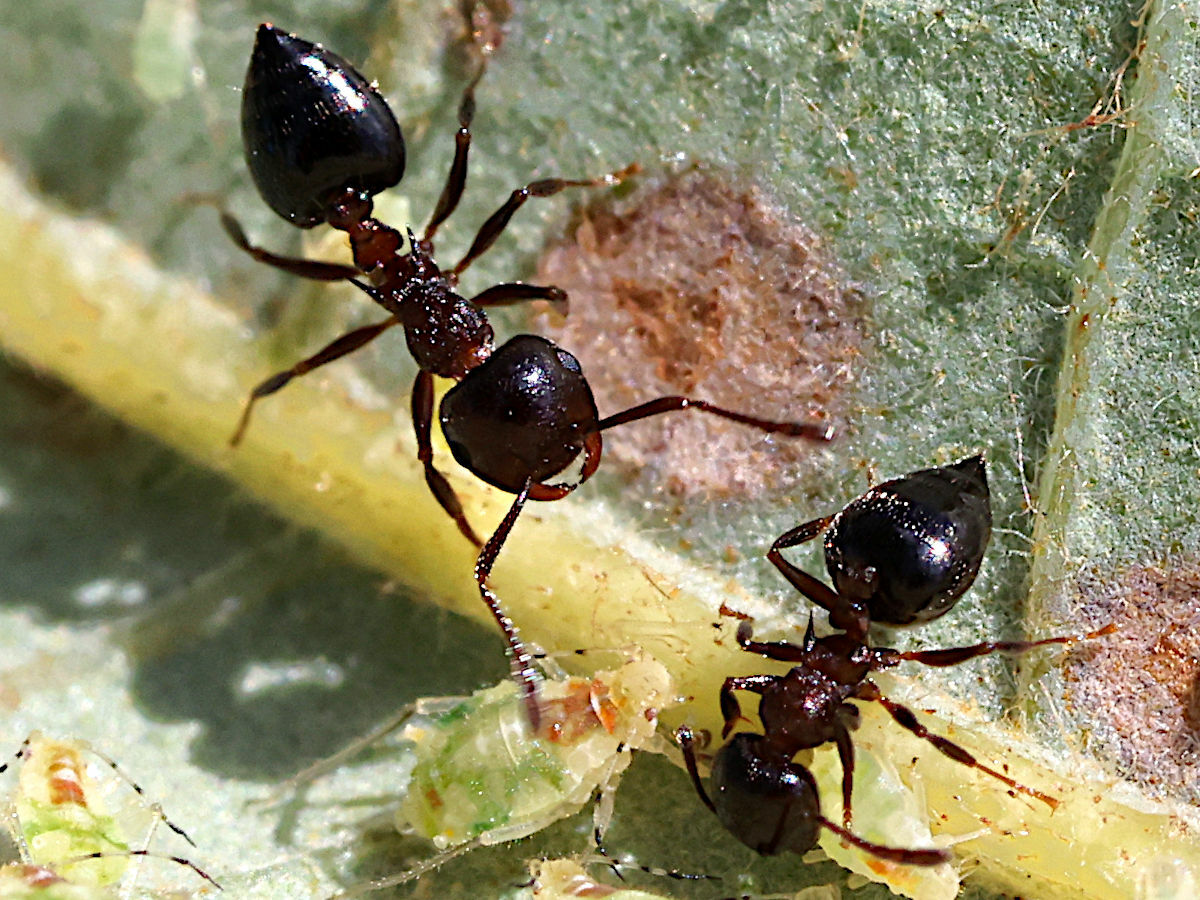
- dorsal view

Scientific classification
- Kingdom: Animalia
- Phylum: Arthropoda
- Clade: Pancrustacea
- Class: Insecta
- Order: Hymenoptera
- Family: Formicidae
- Subfamily: Myrmicinae
- Genus: Crematogaster
- Species: C. cerasi

Binomial name
- Crematogaster cerasi Fitch, 1855

= Crematogaster cerasi =

Species of ant

Crematogaster cerasi is a species of ant in tribe Crematogastrini. It was described by Asa Fitch in 1855.

== Physical characteristics ==
Crematogaster cerasi are identified by the long hairs found on their shoulder and dorsum. Unlike others from the genus Crematogaster, there are only 3–5 hairs on each of these areas. Ridges on the thoracic dorsal are also indicators of a Crematogaster cerasi. Ridges are short and discontinuous. The bodies of the ants are unicolored.

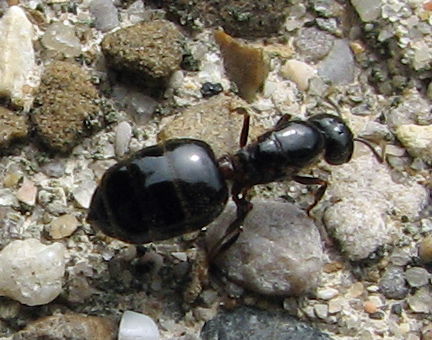
queen

== Diet ==
Crematogaster cerasi are omnivorous. This means that they have the ability to eat both non-vegetarian food as well as plants and seeds. They eat dead bugs and smaller insects. They also consume nectar of flowers.

== Predators ==
Predators consist of spiders, rodents, beetles, birds and sometimes but not often, black bears. Having this many known predators makes them a necessary part of the ecosystem.
