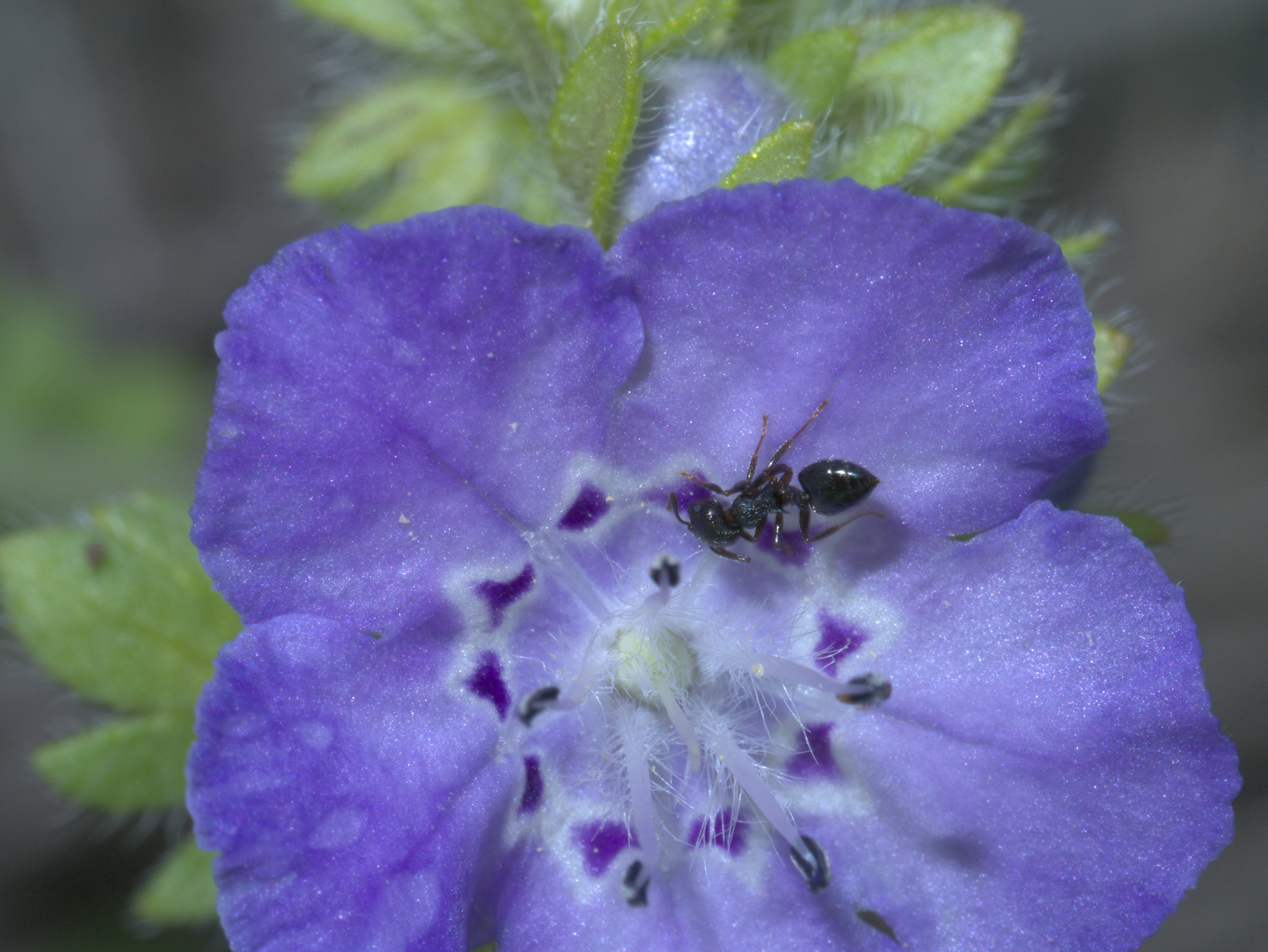

Scientific classification
- Domain: Eukaryota
- Kingdom: Animalia
- Phylum: Arthropoda
- Class: Insecta
- Order: Hymenoptera
- Family: Formicidae
- Subfamily: Myrmicinae
- Genus: Crematogaster
- Species: C. lineolata

Binomial name
- Crematogaster lineolata (Say, 1836)

= Crematogaster lineolata =

Species of ant

Crematogaster lineolata is a species of ant in the family Formicidae.

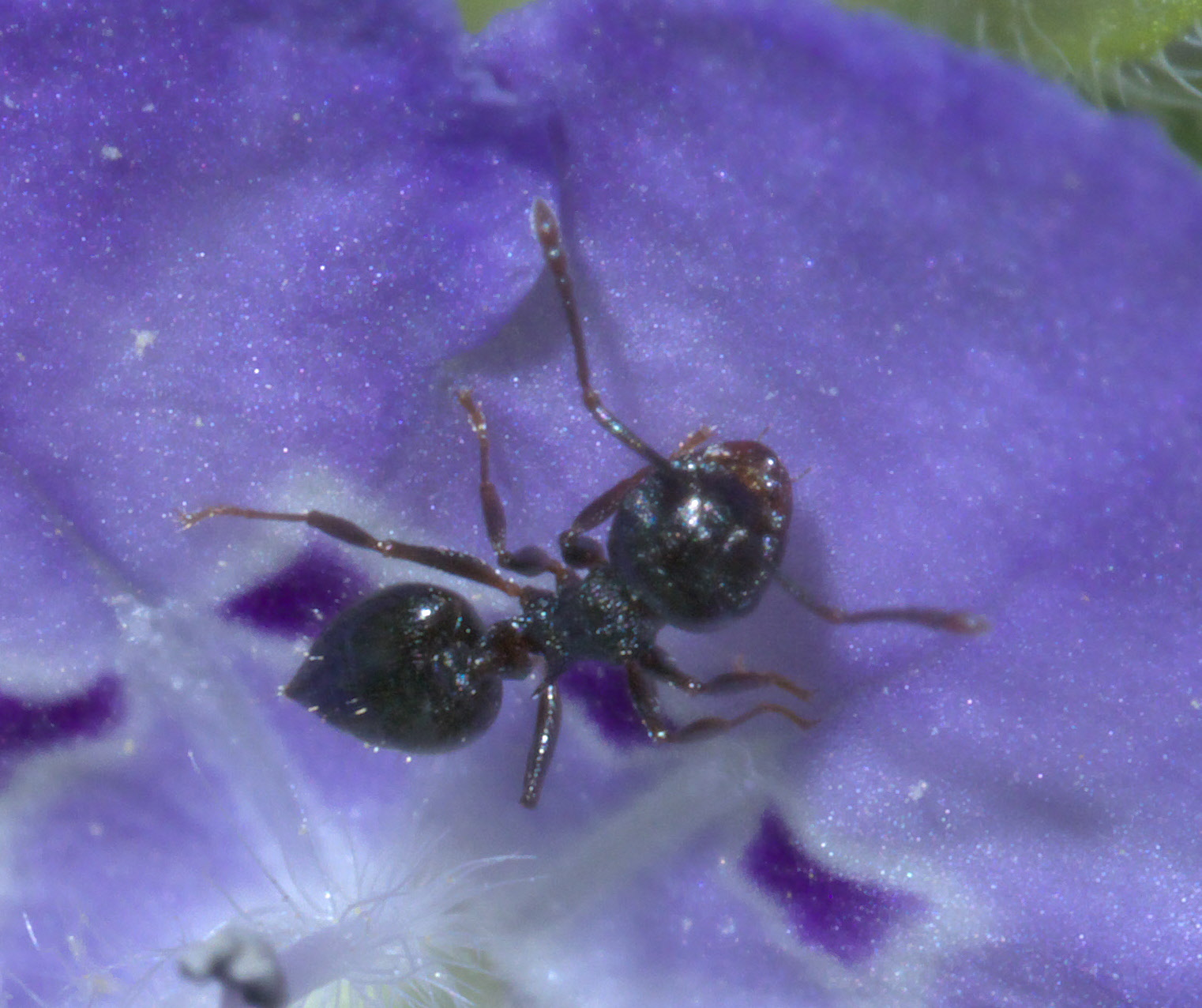
