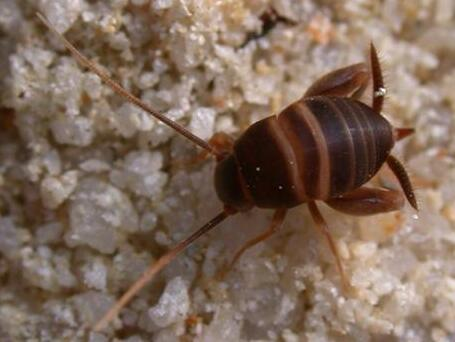
- Myrmecophilus acervorum

Scientific classification
- Kingdom: Animalia
- Phylum: Arthropoda
- Clade: Pancrustacea
- Class: Insecta
- Order: Orthoptera
- Suborder: Ensifera
- Superfamily: Gryllotalpoidea
- Family: Myrmecophilidae; Saussure, 1874

Synonyms
- Myrmecophiloidea Saussure, 1874; Myrmecophiliens Saussure, 1874

= Ant cricket =

Family of cricket-like animals

The Myrmecophilidae or ant-loving crickets are rarely encountered relatives of mole crickets. They are very small, wingless, and flattened, resembling small cockroach nymphs. The few genera contain fewer than 100 species. Ant crickets are yellow, brown, or nearly black in color. They do not produce sound, and lack both wings and tympanal organs ("ears") on the front tibia.

Species of the subfamily Bothriophylacinae live in caves and the burrows of desert vertebrates rather than ant nests. The three extant ant cricket genera (subfamily Myrmecophilinae) are obligate kleptoparasites of ants. They obtain food by soliciting trophallaxis in their host ants or by scraping off waxes from the bodies of ants.

== Tribes and genera ==
The Orthoptera Species File lists two subfamilies:

=== Bothriophylacinae ===
Auth.: Miram, 1934; distribution: northern Africa, western Asia

- tribe Bothriophylacini Miram, 1934
  - Bothriophylax Miram, 1934
  - Eremogryllodes Chopard, 1929
- tribe Microbothriophylacini Gorochov, 2017
  - Microbothriophylax Gorochov, 1993

=== Myrmecophilinae ===
Auth.: Saussure, 1874; distribution: global

- tribe Myrmecophilini Saussure, 1874
  - Myrmecophilus Berthold, 1827
  - Myrmecophilellus Uvarov, 1940
- Incertae sedis
  - †Araripemyrmecophilops Martins-Neto, 1991
  - Camponophilus Ingrisch, 1995
