= T. silvestrii =

T. silvestrii may refer to:

- Tapinoma silvestrii, Wheeler, 1928, an ant species in the genus Tapinoma
- Taracus silvestrii, Roewer, 1930, a harvestman species in the genus Taracus and the family Sabaconidae living in caves in the United States

== See also ==
- Silvestrii (disambiguation)
