= Crematogaster crassicornis =

Scientific classification
- Kingdom: Animalia
- Phylum: Arthropoda
- Clade: Pancrustacea
- Class: Insecta
- Order: Hymenoptera
- Family: Formicidae
- Subfamily: Myrmicinae
- Genus: Crematogaster
- Species: C. crassicornis

Binomial name
- Crematogaster crassicornis Emery, 1893

Species of ant

Crematogaster crassicornis is a species of ant in tribe Crematogastrini. It was described by Emery in 1893.
