= Crematogaster chiarinii =

Scientific classification
- Kingdom: Animalia
- Phylum: Arthropoda
- Clade: Pancrustacea
- Class: Insecta
- Order: Hymenoptera
- Family: Formicidae
- Subfamily: Myrmicinae
- Genus: Crematogaster
- Species: C. chiarinii

Binomial name
- Crematogaster chiarinii Emery, 1881

Species of ant

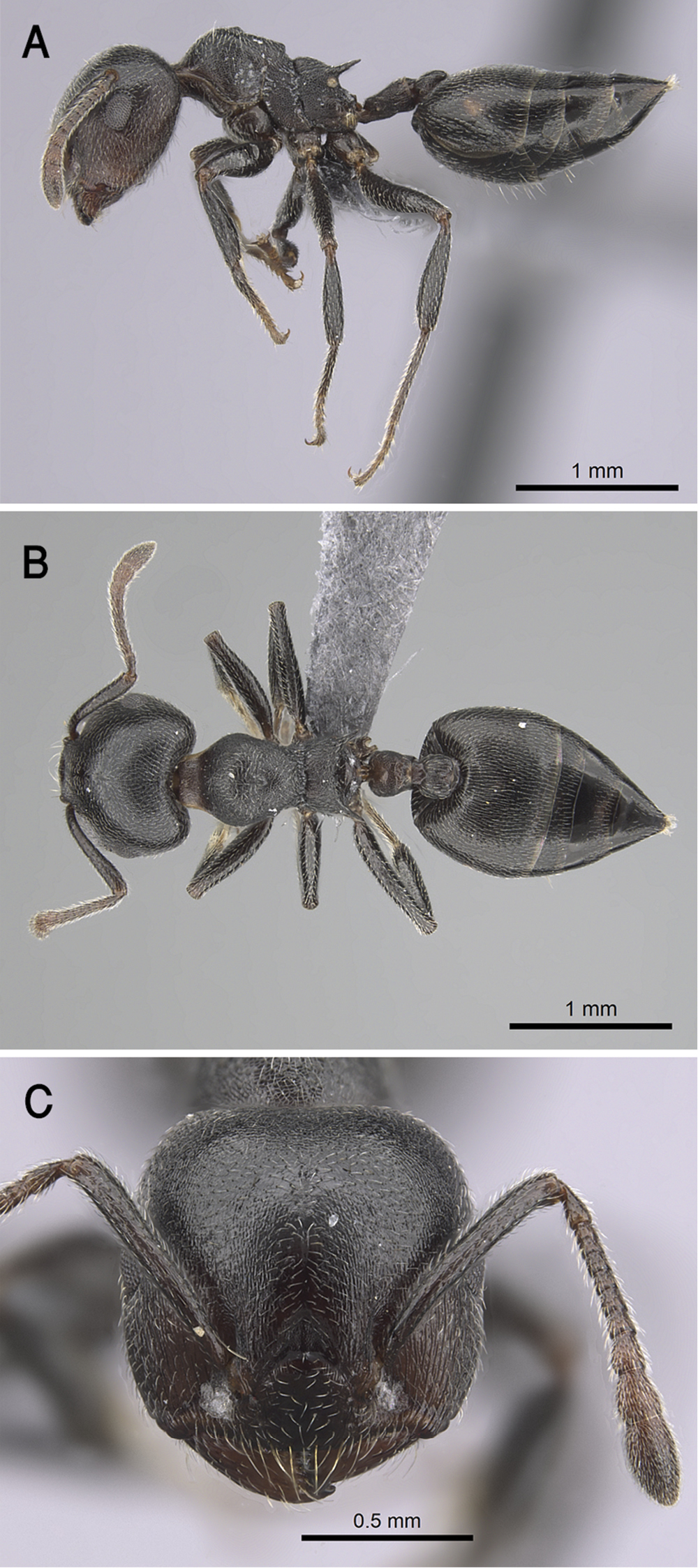

Crematogaster chiarinii is a species of ant in tribe Crematogastrini. It was described by Emery in 1881.
