= Tapinoma heyeri =

Scientific classification
- Domain: Eukaryota
- Kingdom: Animalia
- Phylum: Arthropoda
- Class: Insecta
- Order: Hymenoptera
- Family: Formicidae
- Subfamily: Dolichoderinae
- Genus: Tapinoma
- Species: T. heyeri

Binomial name
- Tapinoma heyeri Forel, 1902

Subspecies
- Tapinoma heyeri risii Forel, 1912

Species of ant

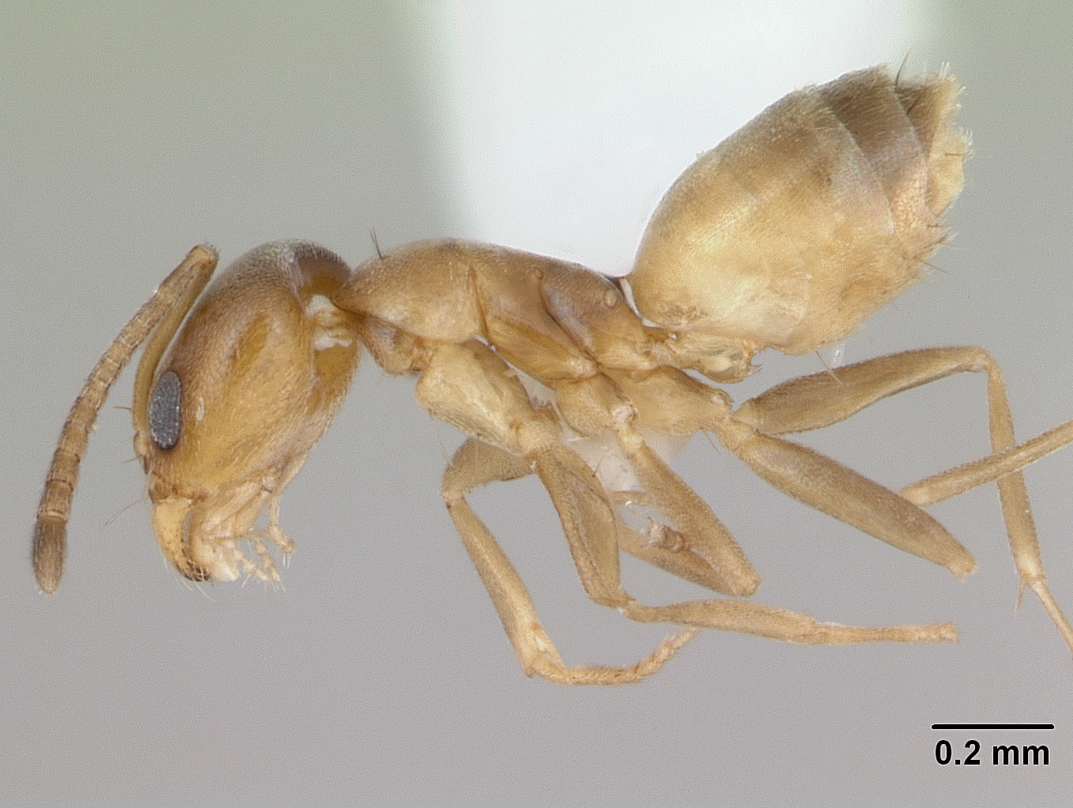

Tapinoma heyeri is a species of ant in the genus Tapinoma. Described by Forel in 1902, the species is endemic to Brazil.
