= Crematogaster constructor =

Scientific classification
- Domain: Eukaryota
- Kingdom: Animalia
- Phylum: Arthropoda
- Class: Insecta
- Order: Hymenoptera
- Family: Formicidae
- Subfamily: Myrmicinae
- Genus: Crematogaster
- Species: C. constructor

Binomial name
- Crematogaster constructor Emery, 1895

Species of ant

Crematogaster constructor is a species of ant in tribe Crematogastrini. It was described by Emery in 1895.
