= Tapinoma himalaica =

Scientific classification
- Domain: Eukaryota
- Kingdom: Animalia
- Phylum: Arthropoda
- Class: Insecta
- Order: Hymenoptera
- Family: Formicidae
- Subfamily: Dolichoderinae
- Genus: Tapinoma
- Species: T. himalaica

Binomial name
- Tapinoma himalaica Bharti, Kumar & Dubovikov, 2013

Species of ant

Tapinoma himalaica is a species of ant in the genus Tapinoma. Described by Bharti, Kumar and Dubovikov in 2013, the species is endemic to India.
