= Tapinoma acuminatum =

Scientific classification
- Kingdom: Animalia
- Phylum: Arthropoda
- Clade: Pancrustacea
- Class: Insecta
- Order: Hymenoptera
- Family: Formicidae
- Subfamily: Dolichoderinae
- Tribe: Tapinomini
- Genus: Tapinoma
- Species: T. acuminatum

Binomial name
- Tapinoma acuminatum Forel, 1907

Species of ant

Tapinoma acuminatum is a species of ant in the genus Tapinoma. Described by Forel in 1907, the species is endemic to Kenya.
