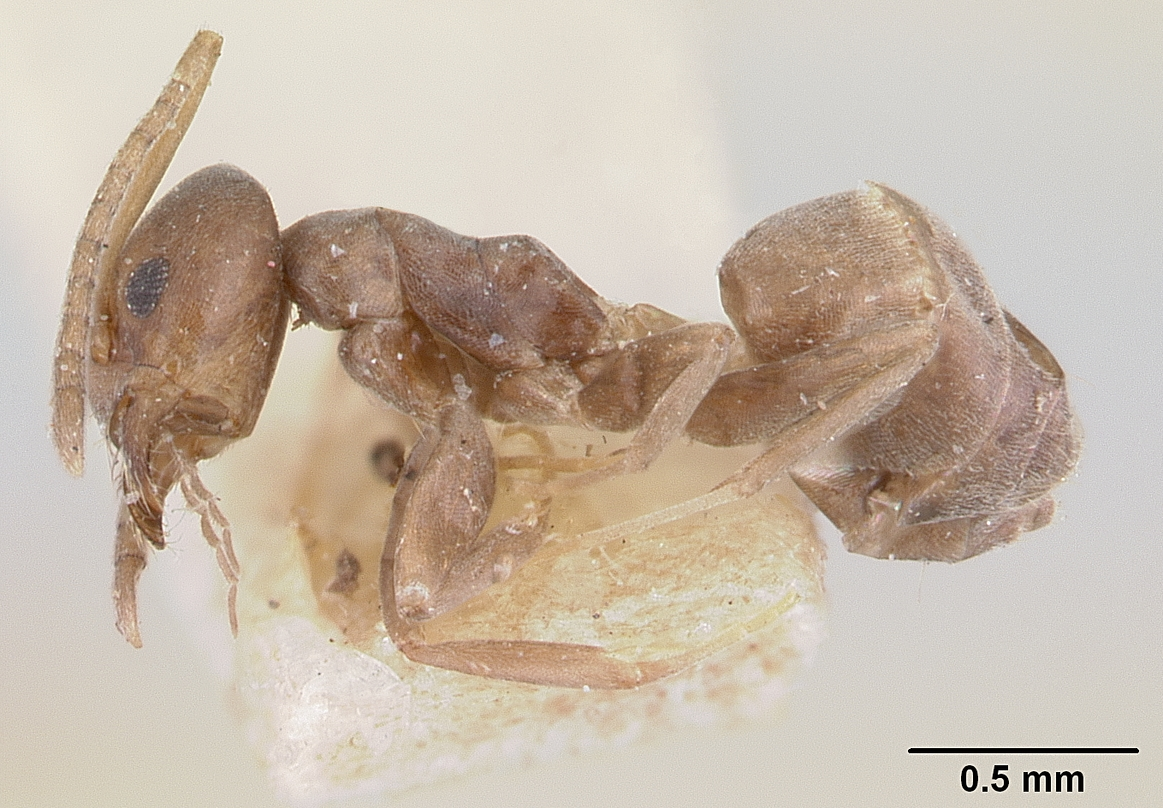

Scientific classification
- Kingdom: Animalia
- Phylum: Arthropoda
- Clade: Pancrustacea
- Class: Insecta
- Order: Hymenoptera
- Family: Formicidae
- Subfamily: Dolichoderinae
- Genus: Tapinoma
- Species: T. luridum

Binomial name
- Tapinoma luridum Emery, 1908

Subspecies
- Tapinoma luridum connexum Santschi, 1914; Tapinoma luridum longiceps Wheeler, W.M., 1922; Tapinoma luridum sokolovi Karavaiev, 1931

= Tapinoma luridum =

Species of ant

Tapinoma luridum is a species of ant in the genus Tapinoma. Described by Emery in 1908, the species is endemic to the Democratic Republic of Congo and Guinea.
