= Tapinoma emeryanum =

Scientific classification
- Domain: Eukaryota
- Kingdom: Animalia
- Phylum: Arthropoda
- Class: Insecta
- Order: Hymenoptera
- Family: Formicidae
- Subfamily: Dolichoderinae
- Genus: Tapinoma
- Species: T. emeryanum

Binomial name
- Tapinoma emeryanum Kuznetsov-Ugamsky, 1927

Subspecies
- Tapinoma emeryanum dagestanicum Kuznetsov-Ugamsky, 1927

Species of ant

Tapinoma emeryanum is a species of ant in the genus Tapinoma. Described by Nikolaj Nikolajevitsch Kuznetsov-Ugamsky in 1927, the species is endemic to Kazakhstan and Kyrgyzstan.
