= Tapinoma minor =

Scientific classification
- Domain: Eukaryota
- Kingdom: Animalia
- Phylum: Arthropoda
- Class: Insecta
- Order: Hymenoptera
- Family: Formicidae
- Subfamily: Dolichoderinae
- Genus: Tapinoma
- Species: T. minor

Binomial name
- Tapinoma minor Bernard, 1945

Species of ant

Tapinoma minor is a species of ant in the genus Tapinoma. Described by Bernard in 1945, the species is endemic to Morocco.
