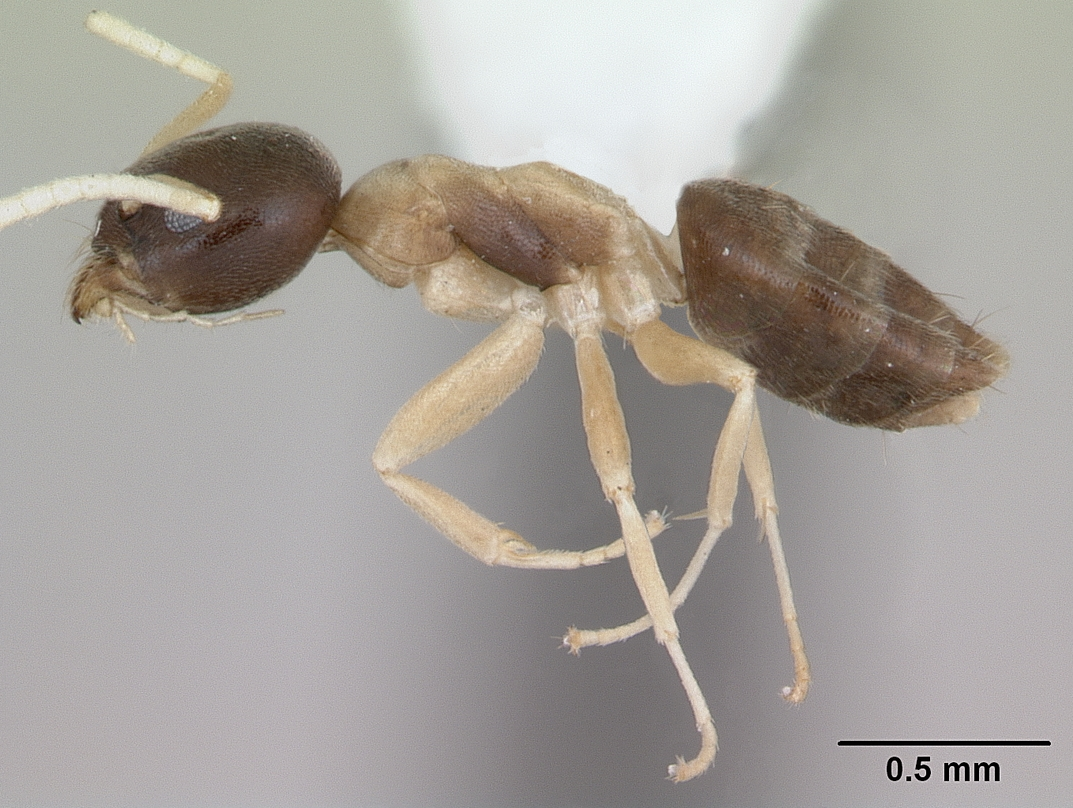

Scientific classification
- Kingdom: Animalia
- Phylum: Arthropoda
- Clade: Pancrustacea
- Class: Insecta
- Order: Hymenoptera
- Family: Formicidae
- Subfamily: Dolichoderinae
- Genus: Tapinoma
- Species: T. atriceps

Binomial name
- Tapinoma atriceps Emery, 1888

Subspecies
- Tapinoma atriceps breviscapum Forel, 1908

= Tapinoma atriceps =

Species of ant

Tapinoma atriceps is a species of ant in the genus Tapinoma. Described by Emery in 1888, the species is endemic to Brazil and Paraguay.
