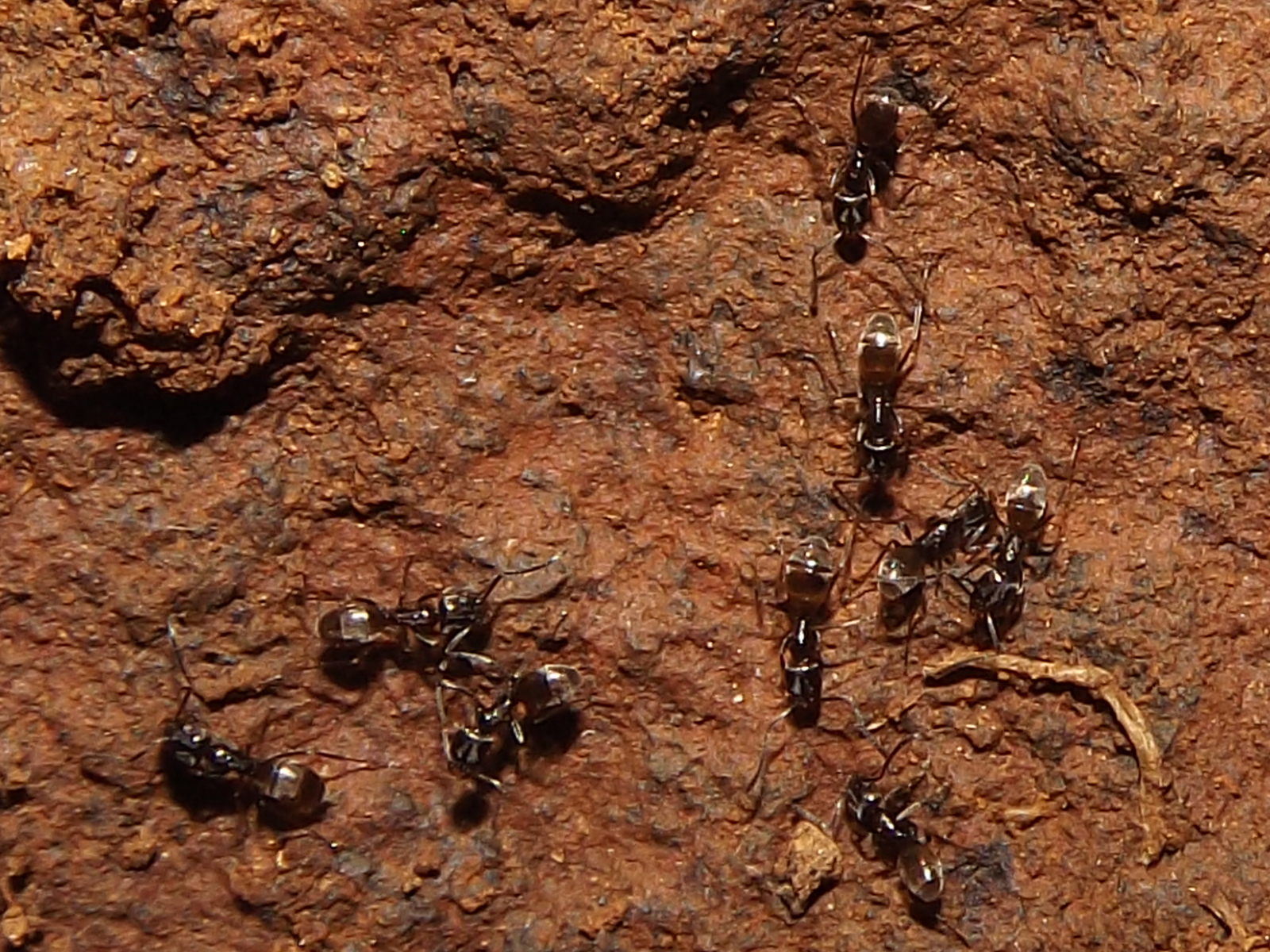

Scientific classification
- Kingdom: Animalia
- Phylum: Arthropoda
- Class: Insecta
- Order: Hymenoptera
- Family: Formicidae
- Subfamily: Dolichoderinae
- Genus: Tapinoma
- Species: T. antarcticum

Binomial name
- Tapinoma antarcticum Forel, 1904

Synonyms
- Forelius eidmanni Goetsch, 1933; Tapinoma fazi Santschi, 1923

= Tapinoma antarcticum =

Species of ant

Tapinoma antarcticum is a species of ant in the genus Tapinoma. Described by Forel in 1904, the species is endemic to Chile.
