= Tapinoma glaesaria =

Scientific classification
- Kingdom: Animalia
- Phylum: Arthropoda
- Clade: Pancrustacea
- Class: Insecta
- Order: Hymenoptera
- Family: Formicidae
- Subfamily: Dolichoderinae
- Genus: Tapinoma
- Species: †T. glaesaria

Binomial name
- †Tapinoma glaesaria Perrichot, Salas-Gismondi & Antoine, 2019

Species of ant

Tapinoma glaesaria is an extinct species of ant in the genus Tapinoma. Originally described by Gennady Dlussky in 2002 as Tapinoma aberrans, fossils of the species were found in the Rovno amber in Ukraine. The original specific name was a secondary homonym of Tapinoma aberrans (Santschi, 1911), an extant species from Madagascar. Perrichot, Salas-Gismondi & Antoine (2019) coined a replacement name T. glaesaria for the taxon described by Dlussky.
