= Tapinoma albinase =

Scientific classification
- Domain: Eukaryota
- Kingdom: Animalia
- Phylum: Arthropoda
- Class: Insecta
- Order: Hymenoptera
- Family: Formicidae
- Subfamily: Dolichoderinae
- Tribe: Tapinomini
- Genus: Tapinoma
- Species: T. albinase

Binomial name
- Tapinoma albinase Forel, 1910

Species of ant

Tapinoma albinase is a species of ant in the genus Tapinoma. Described by Forel in 1910, the species is endemic to South Africa.
