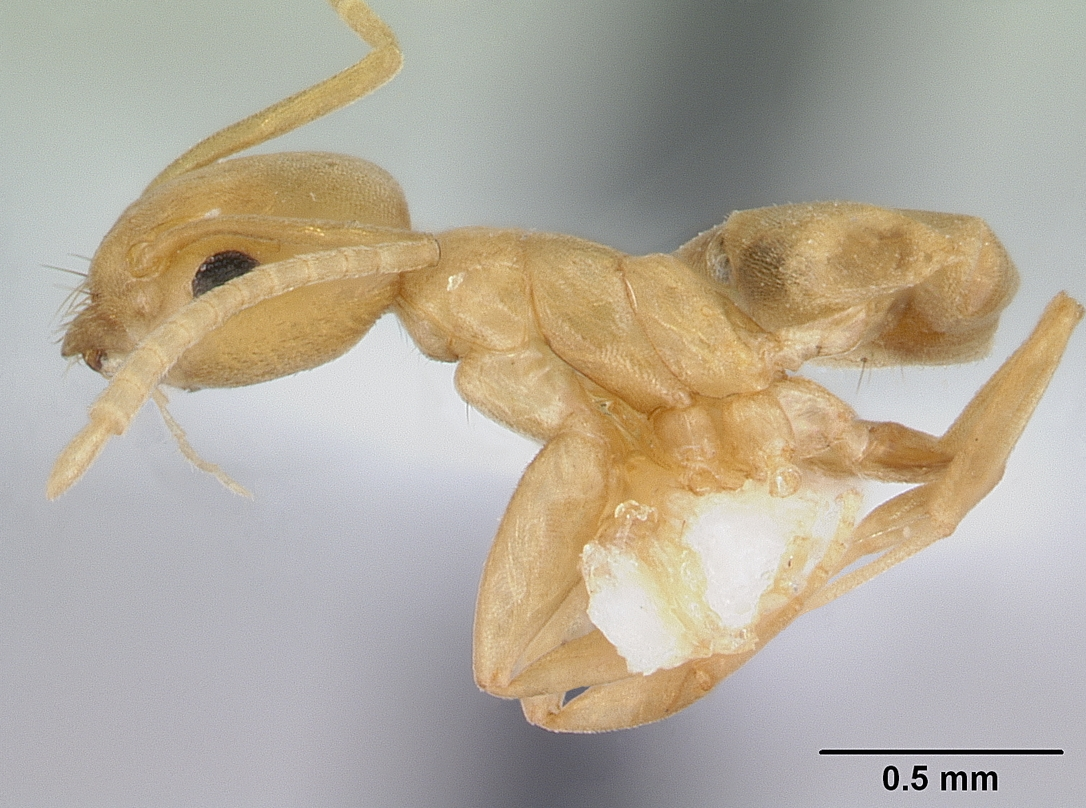

Scientific classification
- Domain: Eukaryota
- Kingdom: Animalia
- Phylum: Arthropoda
- Class: Insecta
- Order: Hymenoptera
- Family: Formicidae
- Subfamily: Dolichoderinae
- Genus: Tapinoma
- Species: T. luteum

Binomial name
- Tapinoma luteum (Emery, 1895)

Subspecies
- Tapinoma luteum natalicum Özdikmen, 2010

= Tapinoma luteum =

Species of ant

Tapinoma luteum is a species of ant in the genus Tapinoma. Described by Emery in 1895, the species is endemic to various countries in Africa.
