= Mordellistena dives =

Scientific classification
- Domain: Eukaryota
- Kingdom: Animalia
- Phylum: Arthropoda
- Class: Insecta
- Order: Coleoptera
- Suborder: Polyphaga
- Infraorder: Cucujiformia
- Family: Mordellidae
- Genus: Mordellistena
- Species: M. dives

Binomial name
- Mordellistena dives Emery, 1876

Species of beetle

Mordellistena dives is a species of beetle in the family Mordellidae which is in the genus Mordellistena. It was described in 1876 by Emery. and can be found in Hungary and southern part of Russia.
