= Tapinoma sinense =

Scientific classification
- Kingdom: Animalia
- Phylum: Arthropoda
- Clade: Pancrustacea
- Class: Insecta
- Order: Hymenoptera
- Family: Formicidae
- Subfamily: Dolichoderinae
- Genus: Tapinoma
- Species: T. sinense

Binomial name
- Tapinoma sinense Emery, 1925

Species of ant

Tapinoma sinense is a species of ant in the genus Tapinoma. Described by Emery in 1925, the species is endemic to Asia.
