= Tapinoma ramulorum =

Scientific classification
- Domain: Eukaryota
- Kingdom: Animalia
- Phylum: Arthropoda
- Class: Insecta
- Order: Hymenoptera
- Family: Formicidae
- Subfamily: Dolichoderinae
- Genus: Tapinoma
- Species: T. ramulorum

Binomial name
- Tapinoma ramulorum Emery, 1896

Subspecies
- Tapinoma ramulorum annellatum Wheeler, W.M., 1934; Tapinoma ramulorum inrectum Forel, 1908; Tapinoma ramulorum saga Forel, 1912; Tapinoma ramulorum satullum Wheeler, W.M., 1934; Tapinoma ramulorum toltecum Wheeler, W.M., 1934

Species of ant

Tapinoma ramulorum is a species of ant in the genus Tapinoma. Described by Emery in 1896, the species is endemic to Costa Rica and Trinidad and Tobago.
