= Tapinoma minutissimum =

Tapinoma minutissimum Temporal range: Oligocene

Scientific classification
- Domain: Eukaryota
- Kingdom: Animalia
- Phylum: Arthropoda
- Class: Insecta
- Order: Hymenoptera
- Family: Formicidae
- Subfamily: Dolichoderinae
- Genus: Tapinoma
- Species: †T. minutissimum

Binomial name
- †Tapinoma minutissimum Emery, 1891

Species of ant

Tapinoma minutissimum is an extinct Oligocene species of ant in the genus Tapinoma. Described by Emery in 1891, specimens of the species were found in Sicilian amber, whence a fossilised male of the species was described.
