= Crematogaster brevis =

Scientific classification
- Kingdom: Animalia
- Phylum: Arthropoda
- Clade: Pancrustacea
- Class: Insecta
- Order: Hymenoptera
- Family: Formicidae
- Subfamily: Myrmicinae
- Genus: Crematogaster
- Species: C. brevis

Binomial name
- Crematogaster brevis Emery, 1887

Species of ant

Crematogaster brevis is a species of ant in tribe Crematogastrini. It was described by Emery in 1887.
