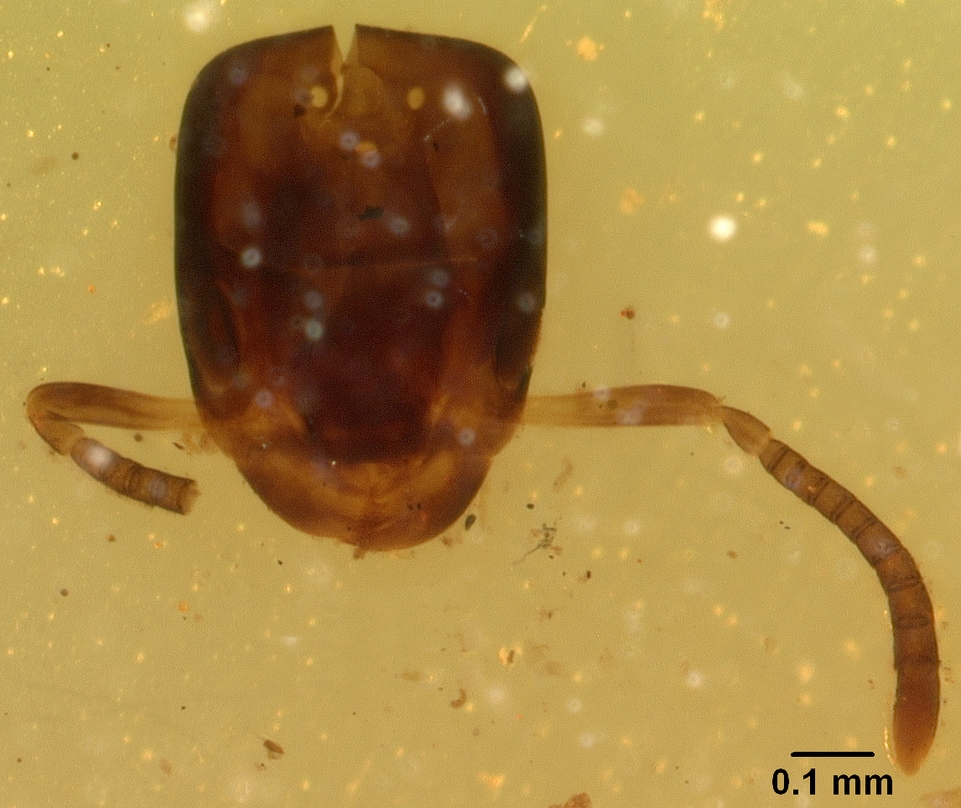
- Head view of ant Tapinoma aberrans specimen

Scientific classification
- Domain: Eukaryota
- Kingdom: Animalia
- Phylum: Arthropoda
- Class: Insecta
- Order: Hymenoptera
- Family: Formicidae
- Subfamily: Dolichoderinae
- Tribe: Tapinomini
- Genus: Tapinoma
- Species: T. aberrans

Binomial name
- Tapinoma aberrans (Santschi, 1911)

= Tapinoma aberrans =

Species of ant

Tapinoma aberrans is a species of ant in the genus Tapinoma. Described by Santschi in 1911, the species is endemic to Madagascar.

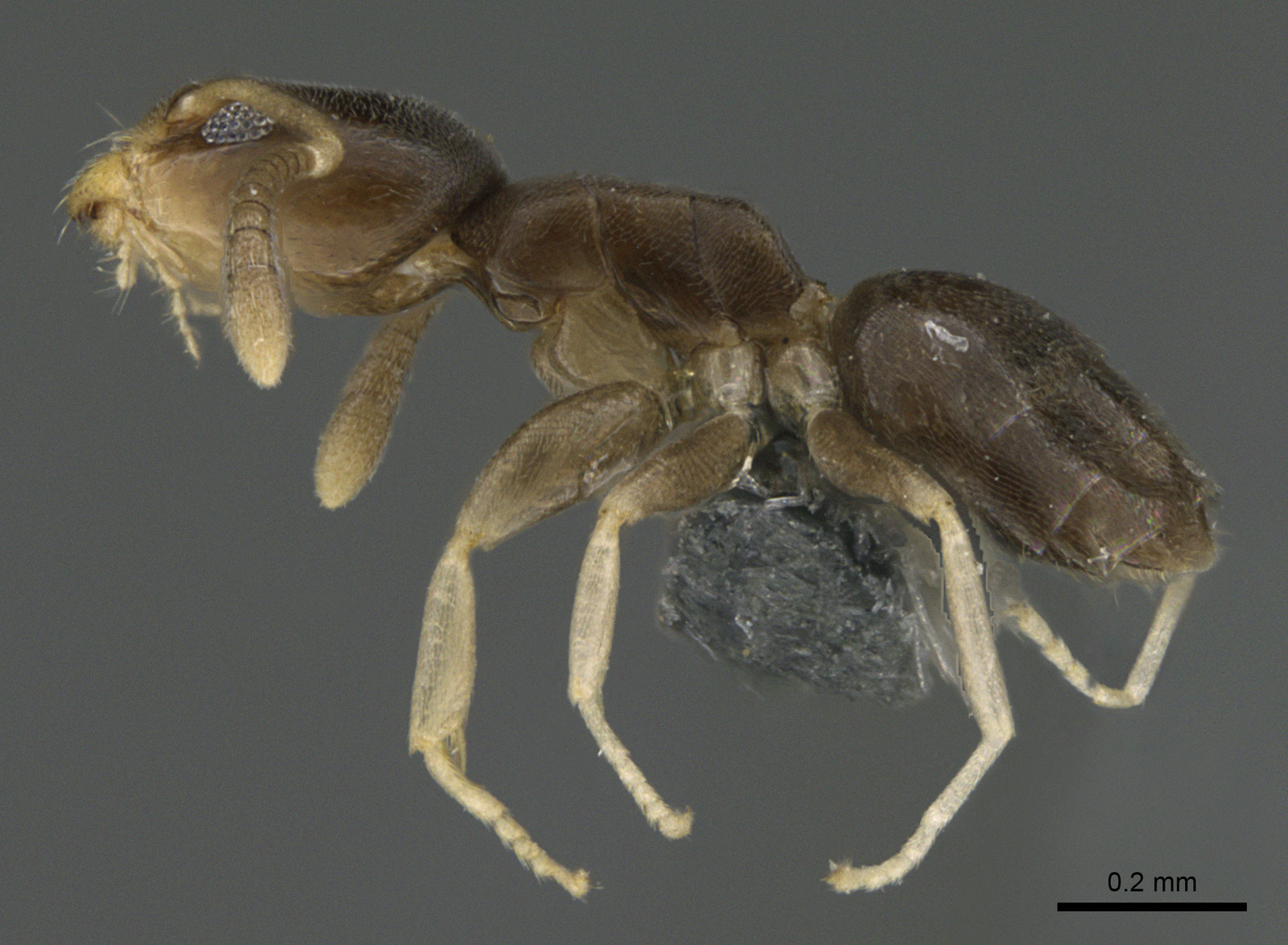
antweb.org specimen
