= Tapinoma sahohime =

Scientific classification
- Kingdom: Animalia
- Phylum: Arthropoda
- Class: Insecta
- Order: Hymenoptera
- Family: Formicidae
- Subfamily: Dolichoderinae
- Genus: Tapinoma
- Species: T. sahohime

Binomial name
- Tapinoma sahohime Terayama, 2013

Species of ant

Tapinoma sahohime is a species of ant in the genus Tapinoma. First described by Terayama in 2013, the species is endemic to Japan.
