= Tapinoma schreiberi =

Scientific classification
- Domain: Eukaryota
- Kingdom: Animalia
- Phylum: Arthropoda
- Class: Insecta
- Order: Hymenoptera
- Family: Formicidae
- Subfamily: Dolichoderinae
- Genus: Tapinoma
- Species: T. schreiberi

Binomial name
- Tapinoma schreiberi Hamm, 2010

Species of ant

Tapinoma schreiberi is a species of ant in the genus Tapinoma. Described by Hamm in 2010, the species is endemic to the United States.
