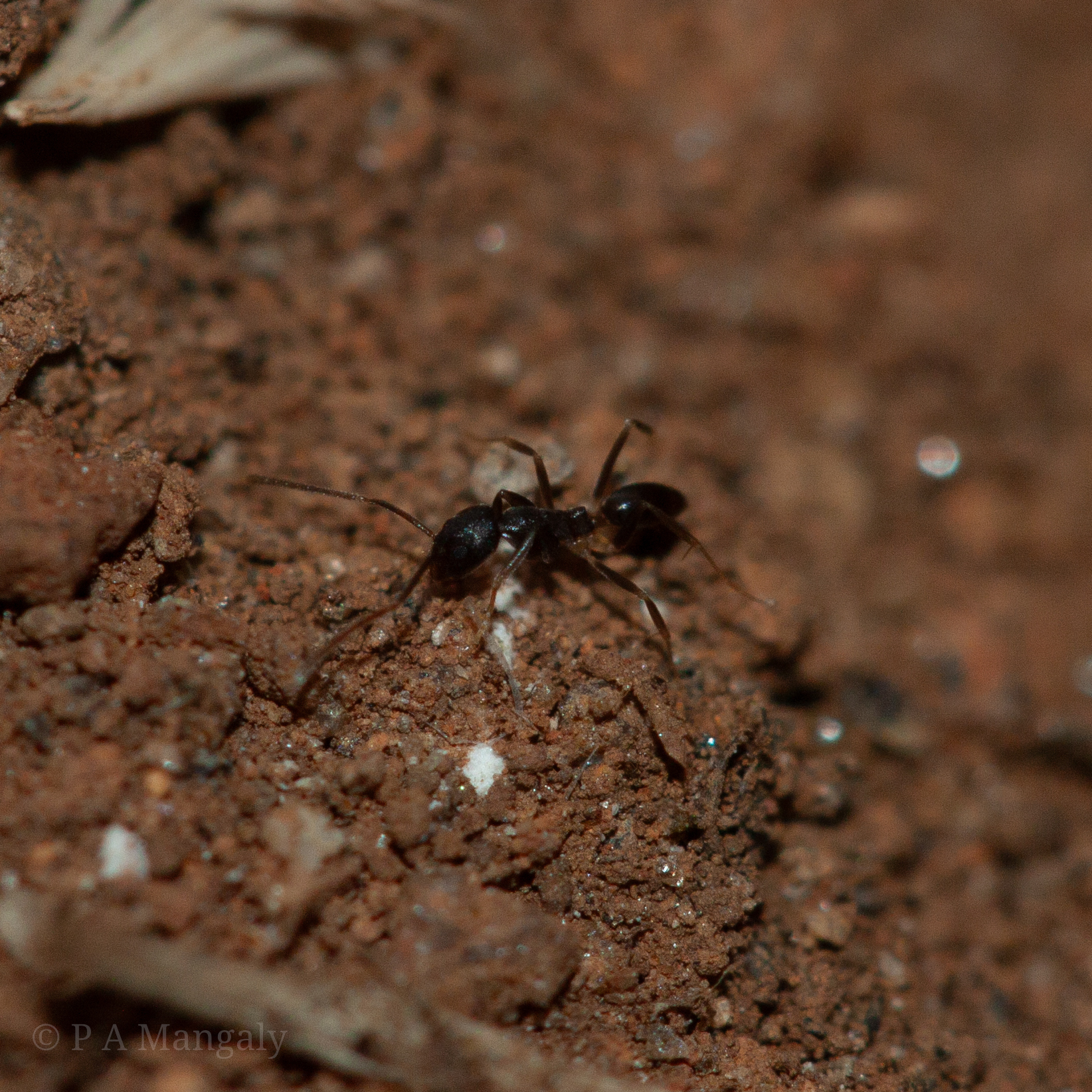

Scientific classification
- Domain: Eukaryota
- Kingdom: Animalia
- Phylum: Arthropoda
- Class: Insecta
- Order: Hymenoptera
- Family: Formicidae
- Subfamily: Dolichoderinae
- Genus: Tapinoma
- Species: T. onaele

Binomial name
- Tapinoma onaele Shakur, Mangaly, Baidya & Bagchi, 2024

= Tapinoma onaele =

Species of ant

Tapinoma onaele is a species of ant in the genus Tapinoma. It was described by Mohammad Abdus Shakur, Paul Mangaly, Pronoy Baidya and Sumanta Bagchi in 2024 from the Western Ghats of India.
