= Tapinoma madeirense =

Scientific classification
- Domain: Eukaryota
- Kingdom: Animalia
- Phylum: Arthropoda
- Class: Insecta
- Order: Hymenoptera
- Family: Formicidae
- Subfamily: Dolichoderinae
- Genus: Tapinoma
- Species: T. madeirense

Binomial name
- Tapinoma madeirense Forel, 1895

Synonyms
- Tapinoma erraticum ambiguum Emery, 1925

Species of ant

Tapinoma madeirense is a species of ant in the genus Tapinoma. Described by Forel in 1895, the species is endemic to various countries to many countries throughout Europe.
