= Tapinoma carininotum =

Scientific classification
- Kingdom: Animalia
- Phylum: Arthropoda
- Clade: Pancrustacea
- Class: Insecta
- Order: Hymenoptera
- Family: Formicidae
- Subfamily: Dolichoderinae
- Genus: Tapinoma
- Species: T. carininotum

Binomial name
- Tapinoma carininotum Weber, 1943

Species of ant

Tapinoma carininotum is a species of ant in the genus Tapinoma. Described by Weber in 1943, the species is endemic to Sudan.
