= Tapinoma minutum =

Scientific classification
- Kingdom: Animalia
- Phylum: Arthropoda
- Class: Insecta
- Order: Hymenoptera
- Family: Formicidae
- Subfamily: Dolichoderinae
- Genus: Tapinoma
- Species: T. minutum

Binomial name
- Tapinoma minutum Mayr, 1862

Subspecies
- Tapinoma minutum broomense Forel, 1915; Tapinoma minutum cephalicum Santschi, 1928; Tapinoma minutum integrum Forel, 1902

Species of ant

Tapinoma minutum is a species of ant in the genus Tapinoma. Described by Gustav Mayr in 1862, the species is endemic to Australia and surrounding countries.
