= Tapinoma gibbosum =

Scientific classification
- Domain: Eukaryota
- Kingdom: Animalia
- Phylum: Arthropoda
- Class: Insecta
- Order: Hymenoptera
- Family: Formicidae
- Subfamily: Dolichoderinae
- Genus: Tapinoma
- Species: T. gibbosum

Binomial name
- Tapinoma gibbosum Stitz, 1933

Species of ant

Tapinoma gibbosum is a species of ant in the genus Tapinoma. Described by Stitz in 1933, the species is endemic to Brazil.
