= Tapinoma wroughtonii =

Scientific classification
- Domain: Eukaryota
- Kingdom: Animalia
- Phylum: Arthropoda
- Class: Insecta
- Order: Hymenoptera
- Family: Formicidae
- Subfamily: Dolichoderinae
- Genus: Tapinoma
- Species: T. wroughtonii

Binomial name
- Tapinoma wroughtonii Forel, 1904

Species of ant

Tapinoma wroughtonii is a species of ant in the genus Tapinoma. Described by Forel in 1904, the species is endemic to Italy, North Korea and South Korea.
