= Tapinoma epinotale =

Scientific classification
- Domain: Eukaryota
- Kingdom: Animalia
- Phylum: Arthropoda
- Class: Insecta
- Order: Hymenoptera
- Family: Formicidae
- Subfamily: Dolichoderinae
- Genus: Tapinoma
- Species: T. epinotale

Binomial name
- Tapinoma epinotale Karavaiev, 1935

Species of ant

Tapinoma epinotale is a species of ant in the genus Tapinoma. Described by Karavaiev in 1935, the species is endemic to Vietnam.
