= Tapinoma latifrons =

Scientific classification
- Domain: Eukaryota
- Kingdom: Animalia
- Phylum: Arthropoda
- Class: Insecta
- Order: Hymenoptera
- Family: Formicidae
- Subfamily: Dolichoderinae
- Genus: Tapinoma
- Species: T. latifrons

Binomial name
- Tapinoma latifrons (Karavaiev, 1933)

Species of ant

Tapinoma latifrons is a species of ant in the genus Tapinoma. Described by Karavaiev in 1924, the species is endemic to Indonesia.
