= Tapinoma albomaculatum =

Scientific classification
- Domain: Eukaryota
- Kingdom: Animalia
- Phylum: Arthropoda
- Class: Insecta
- Order: Hymenoptera
- Family: Formicidae
- Subfamily: Dolichoderinae
- Genus: Tapinoma
- Species: T. albomaculatum

Binomial name
- Tapinoma albomaculatum (Karavaiev, 1926)

Species of ant

Tapinoma albomaculatum is a species of ant in the genus Tapinoma. Described by Karavaiev in 1926, the species is endemic to Indonesia.
