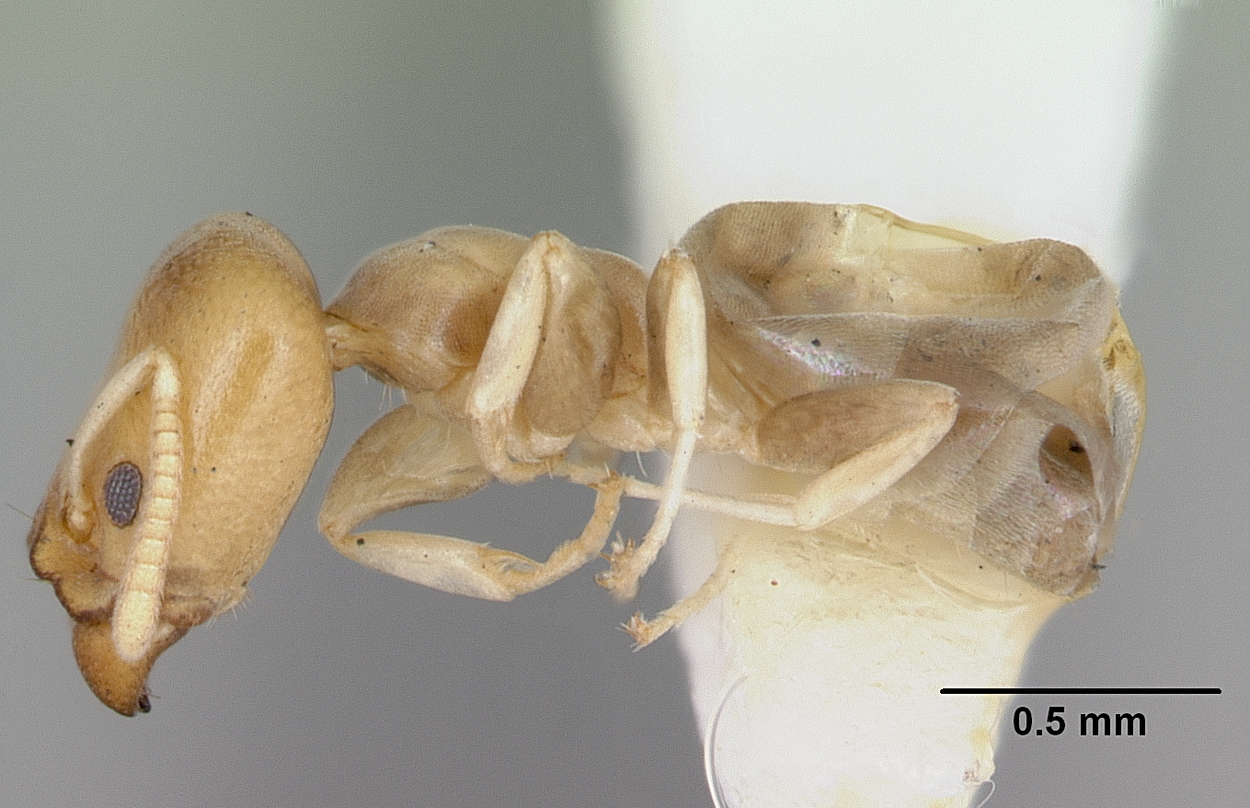

Scientific classification
- Domain: Eukaryota
- Kingdom: Animalia
- Phylum: Arthropoda
- Class: Insecta
- Order: Hymenoptera
- Family: Formicidae
- Subfamily: Dolichoderinae
- Genus: Tapinoma
- Species: T. annandalei

Binomial name
- Tapinoma annandalei (Wheeler, W.M., 1928)

= Tapinoma annandalei =

Species of ant

Tapinoma annandalei is a species of ant in the genus Tapinoma. Described by William Morton Wheeler in 1928, the species is endemic to India.
