= Tapinoma chiaromontei =

Scientific classification
- Domain: Eukaryota
- Kingdom: Animalia
- Phylum: Arthropoda
- Class: Insecta
- Order: Hymenoptera
- Family: Formicidae
- Subfamily: Dolichoderinae
- Genus: Tapinoma
- Species: T. chiaromontei

Binomial name
- Tapinoma chiaromontei Menozzi, 1930

Species of ant

Tapinoma chiaromontei is a species of ant in the genus Tapinoma. Described by Menozzi in 1930, the species is endemic to Somalia.
