= Tapinoma troche =

Tapinoma troche Temporal range: Early Miocene Dominican amber

Scientific classification
- Domain: Eukaryota
- Kingdom: Animalia
- Phylum: Arthropoda
- Class: Insecta
- Order: Hymenoptera
- Family: Formicidae
- Subfamily: Dolichoderinae
- Genus: Tapinoma
- Species: †T. troche

Binomial name
- †Tapinoma troche Wilson, 1985

Species of ant

Tapinoma troche is an extinct species of ant in the genus Tapinoma. Described by Wilson in 1985, fossils of the species were found in the Dominican amber, where a fossilised worker of the species was described.
