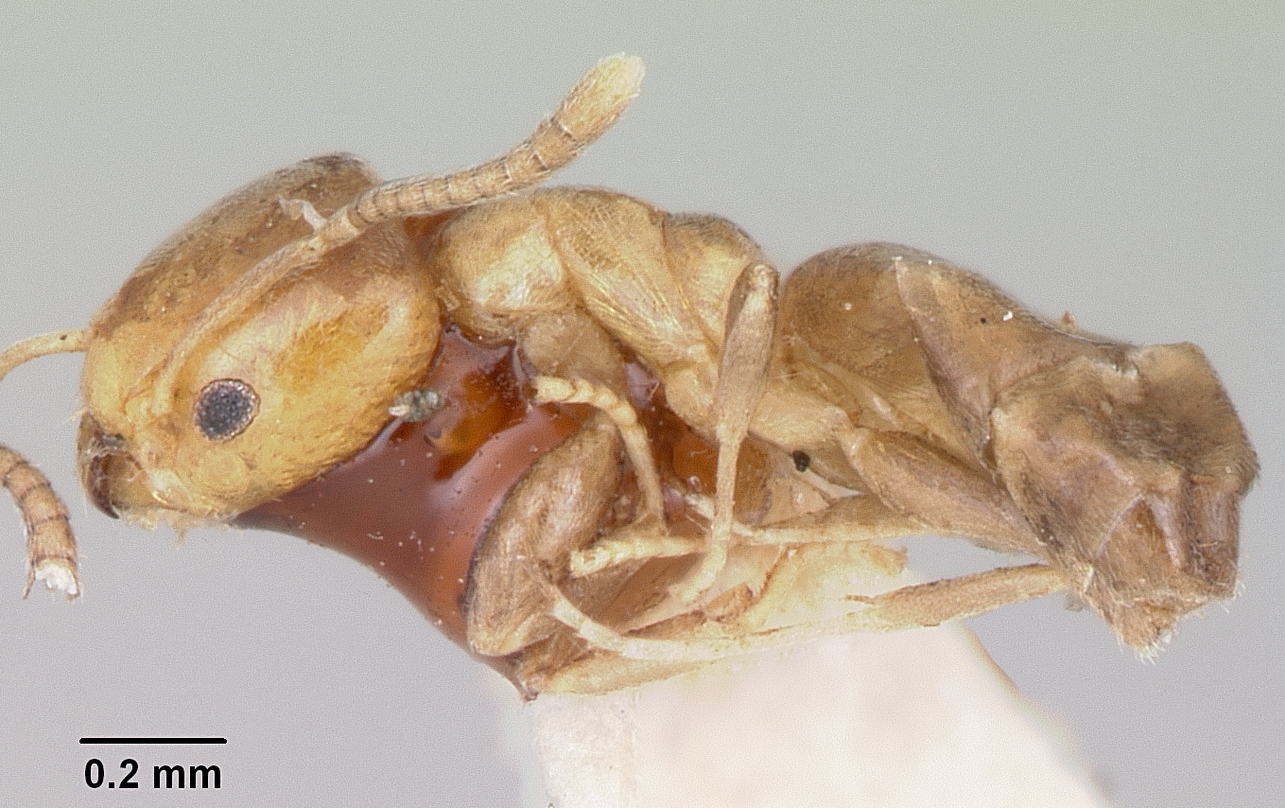

Scientific classification
- Kingdom: Animalia
- Phylum: Arthropoda
- Class: Insecta
- Order: Hymenoptera
- Family: Formicidae
- Subfamily: Dolichoderinae
- Genus: Tapinoma
- Species: T. pomone

Binomial name
- Tapinoma pomone Donisthorpe, 1947

= Tapinoma pomone =

Species of ant

Tapinoma pomone is a species of ant in the genus Tapinoma. Described by Donisthorpe in 1947, the species is endemic to Mauritius.
