= Tapinoma electrinum =

Scientific classification
- Kingdom: Animalia
- Phylum: Arthropoda
- Clade: Pancrustacea
- Class: Insecta
- Order: Hymenoptera
- Family: Formicidae
- Subfamily: Dolichoderinae
- Genus: Tapinoma
- Species: †T. electrinum

Binomial name
- †Tapinoma electrinum Dlussky, 2002

Species of ant

Tapinoma electrinum is an extinct species of ant in the genus Tapinoma. Described by Dlussky in 2002, fossils of the species were found in the Rovno amber in Ukraine, where a fossilised male of the species was described.
