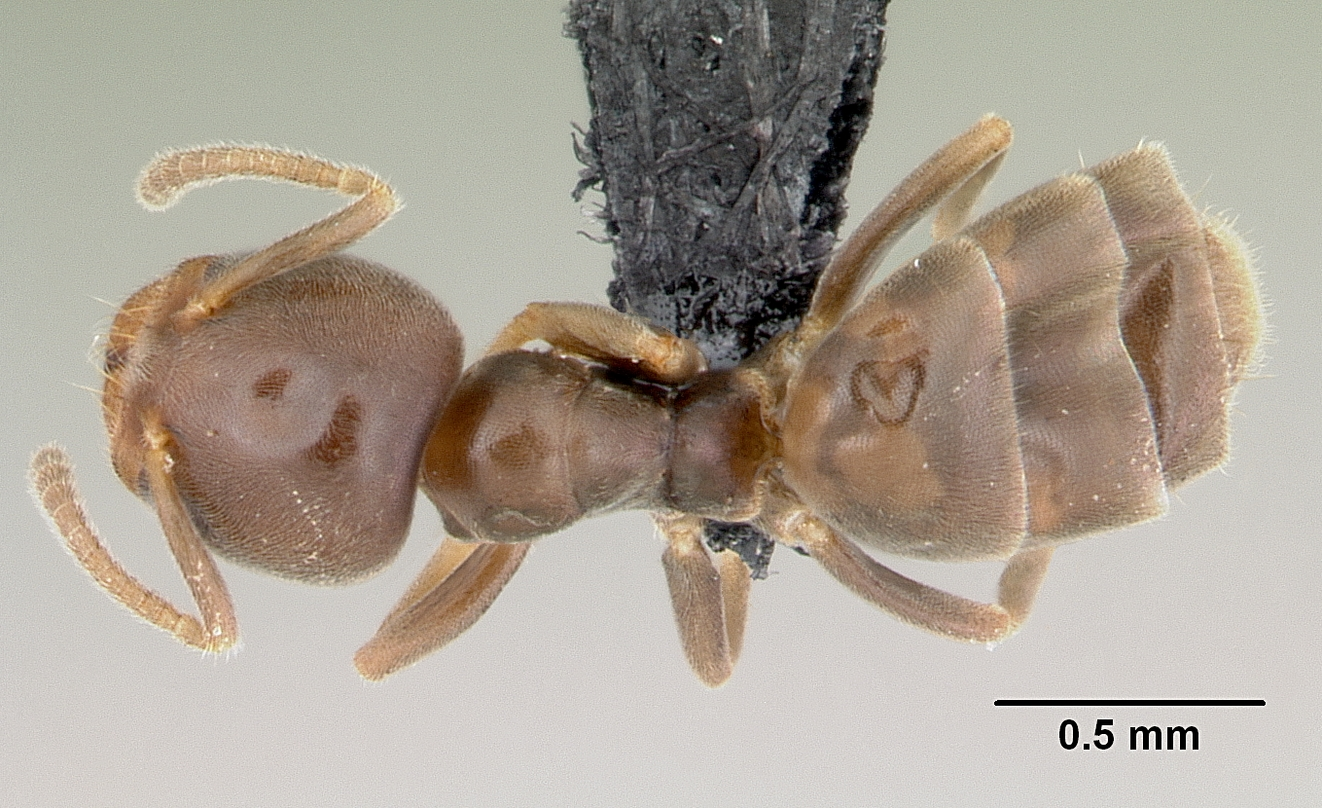

Scientific classification
- Kingdom: Animalia
- Phylum: Arthropoda
- Clade: Pancrustacea
- Class: Insecta
- Order: Hymenoptera
- Family: Formicidae
- Subfamily: Dolichoderinae
- Genus: Aptinoma
- Species: A. antongil

Binomial name
- Aptinoma antongil Fisher, 2009

= Aptinoma antongil =

Species of ant

Aptinoma antongil is a species of ant in the subfamily Dolichoderinae. The species is known only from Antongil Bay, Madagascar.
