= Tapinoma geei =

Scientific classification
- Domain: Eukaryota
- Kingdom: Animalia
- Phylum: Arthropoda
- Class: Insecta
- Order: Hymenoptera
- Family: Formicidae
- Subfamily: Dolichoderinae
- Genus: Tapinoma
- Species: T. geei

Binomial name
- Tapinoma geei Wheeler, W.M., 1927

Subspecies
- Tapinoma geei tinctum Wheeler, W.M., 1927

Species of ant

Tapinoma geei is a species of ant in the genus Tapinoma. Described by William Morton Wheeler in 1927, the species is endemic to China and South Korea.
