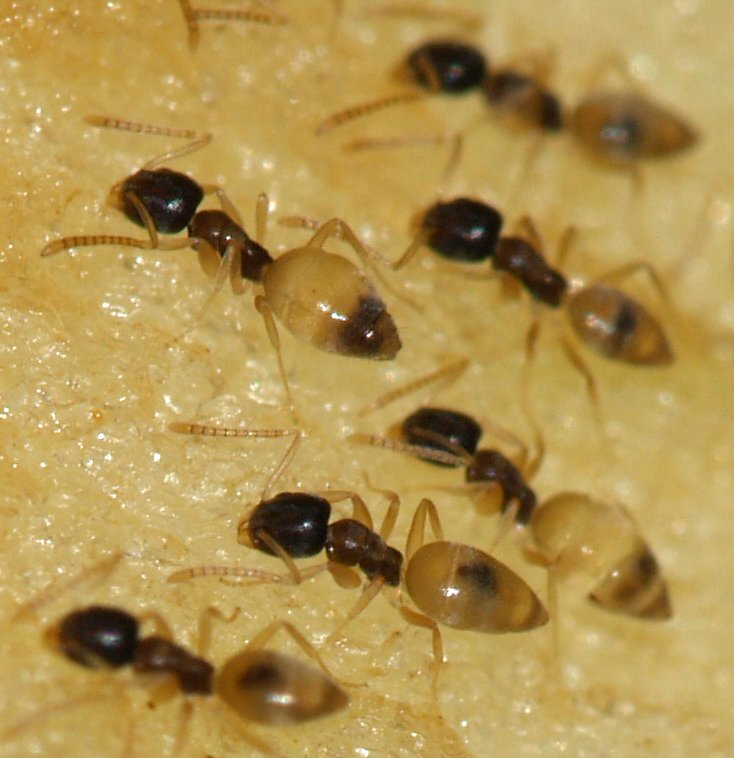
- Workers feeding on apple

Scientific classification
- Kingdom: Animalia
- Phylum: Arthropoda
- Clade: Pancrustacea
- Class: Insecta
- Order: Hymenoptera
- Family: Formicidae
- Subfamily: Dolichoderinae
- Genus: Tapinoma
- Species: T. melanocephalum

Binomial name
- Tapinoma melanocephalum (Fabricius, 1793)

Subspecies
- Tapinoma melanocephalum coronatum Forel, 1908; Tapinoma melanocephalum malesianum Forel, 1913

Synonyms
- Formica familiaris Smith, F., 1860; Formica nana Jerdon, 1851; Myrmica pellucida Smith, F., 1857; Tapinoma melanocephalum australe Santschi, 1928; Tapinoma melanocephalum australis Santschi, 1928

= Tapinoma melanocephalum =

Ghost ant

Species of ant

Tapinoma melanocephalum is a species of ant in the subfamily Dolichoderinae that goes by the common name ghost ant. They are recognised by their dark head and pale or translucent legs and gaster (abdomen), which may make the ant seem smaller.

== Description ==
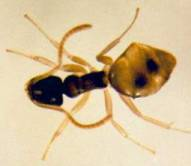
Zoomed up photo of a ghost ant worker, taken from a site in East London

The ghost ant is small, with average worker lengths ranging between 1.3 to 2.0 millimetres (0.051 to 0.079 in). The antennae is composed of 12 segments that thicken towards the tip. The male's head and dorsum is dark in color, while the gaster is light, an may contain several dark marks. The antennal scapes exceeds the occipital border. The head and thorax is a dark brown color while the gaster, legs and antennae are a milky white color. Due to its small size and light colour, the ghost ant is difficult to see. Ghost ants are monomorphic and the thorax is spineless. The gaster is hairless, and has a back opening that is similar to a slit-like opening. The abdominal pedicel is formed from a single segment that is usually not visible due to the gaster. The species does not contain a stinger. During development, this species undergoes three larval instars, which are all naked and fusiform, with reduced mouthparts.

Queens are similar in appearance to workers, but the alitrunk (mesosoma) is enlarged. They usually measure 2.5 millimetres (0.098 in) in length, making them the largest member of the colony.

== Distribution and habitat ==
Due to how widespread the ghost ant is, the exact native range is not exactly known. However, the species is assumed to originate from African or Oriental regions, seeing as it is a tropical species. This has been proven considering the ghost ant cannot adapt to colder climates and are confined to greenhouses and buildings that provide considerable conditions that allows the species to thrive, although a colony of ghost ants was discovered in an apartment block in Canada. One report has even stated the presence of ghost ants in isolated regions, with a colony being found in the Galapagos Islands. The ant is found in 154 geographical areas.

The species is a common pest in the United States, particularly in the states of Hawaii and Florida, although the species is and has been expanding further throughout the country. They are commonly found in the southern parts of Florida, and are considered a key pest, along with several other invasive ant species. The earliest record of the ghost ant in the United States was recorded in Washington, D.C. in 1894. The ghost ant would later be found in other states such as Maine, New York, Connecticut, Virginia, North Carolina, Georgia, Florida, Illinois, Michigan, Wisconsin, Minnesota, Iowa, Missouri, Louisiana, Texas, Kansas, New Mexico, Arizona, California, Oregon and Washington. Ghost ants can also be found in the U.S. territories of Puerto Rico and the U.S. Virgin Islands.
