= Tapinoma orthocephalum =

Scientific classification
- Domain: Eukaryota
- Kingdom: Animalia
- Phylum: Arthropoda
- Class: Insecta
- Order: Hymenoptera
- Family: Formicidae
- Subfamily: Dolichoderinae
- Genus: Tapinoma
- Species: T. orthocephalum

Binomial name
- Tapinoma orthocephalum Stitz, 1934

Species of ant

Tapinoma orthocephalum is a species of ant in the genus Tapinoma. Described by Stitz in 1934, the species is endemic to Mongolia.
