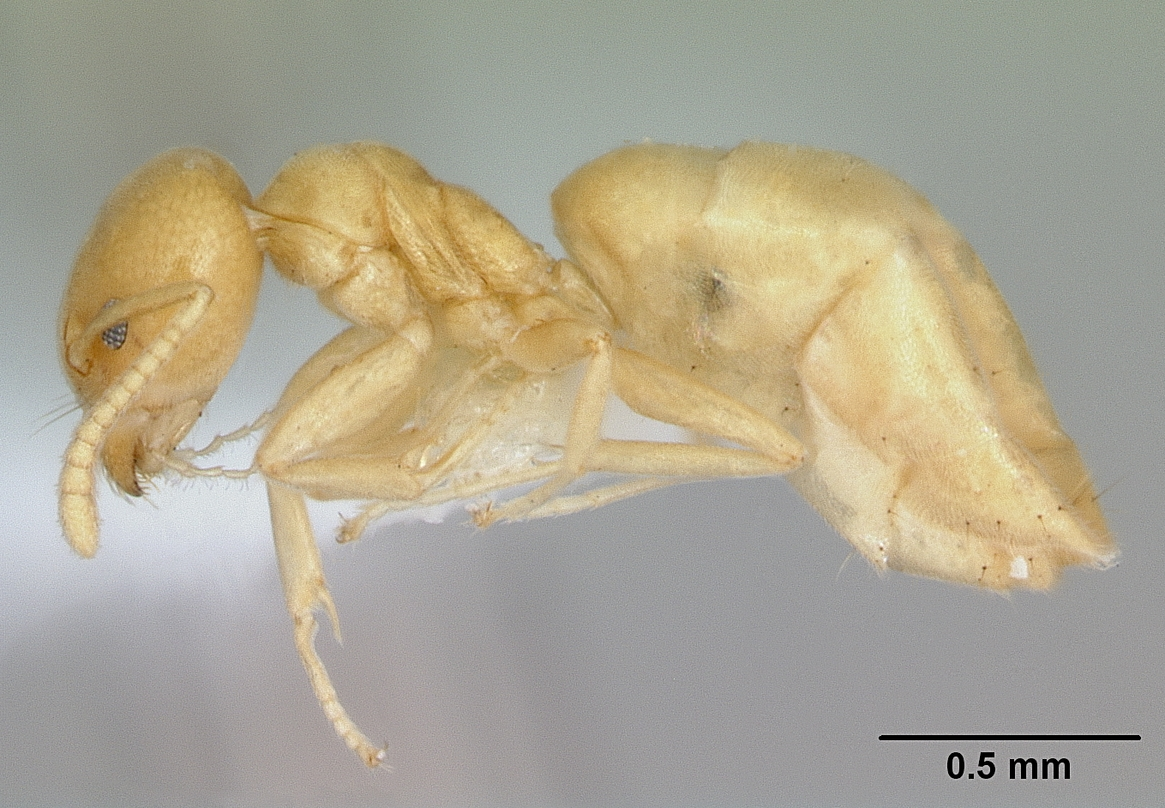
- A. mangabe worker from Madagascar

Scientific classification
- Kingdom: Animalia
- Phylum: Arthropoda
- Class: Insecta
- Order: Hymenoptera
- Family: Formicidae
- Subfamily: Dolichoderinae
- Tribe: Tapinomini
- Genus: Aptinoma; Fisher, 2009

Type species
- Aptinoma mangabe

Diversity
- 2 species

= Aptinoma =

Genus of ants

Aptinoma is a small genus of arboreal ants in the subfamily Dolichoderinae. Its two species are known only from Antongil Bay, Madagascar.

== Species ==
- Aptinoma antongil Fisher, 2009
- Aptinoma mangabe Fisher, 2009
