= Tapinoma funiculare =

Scientific classification
- Kingdom: Animalia
- Phylum: Arthropoda
- Class: Insecta
- Order: Hymenoptera
- Family: Formicidae
- Subfamily: Dolichoderinae
- Genus: Tapinoma
- Species: T. funiculare

Binomial name
- Tapinoma funiculare Santschi, 1928

Species of ant

Tapinoma funiculare is a species of ant in the genus Tapinoma. Described by Santschi in 1928, the species is endemic to Vietnam.
