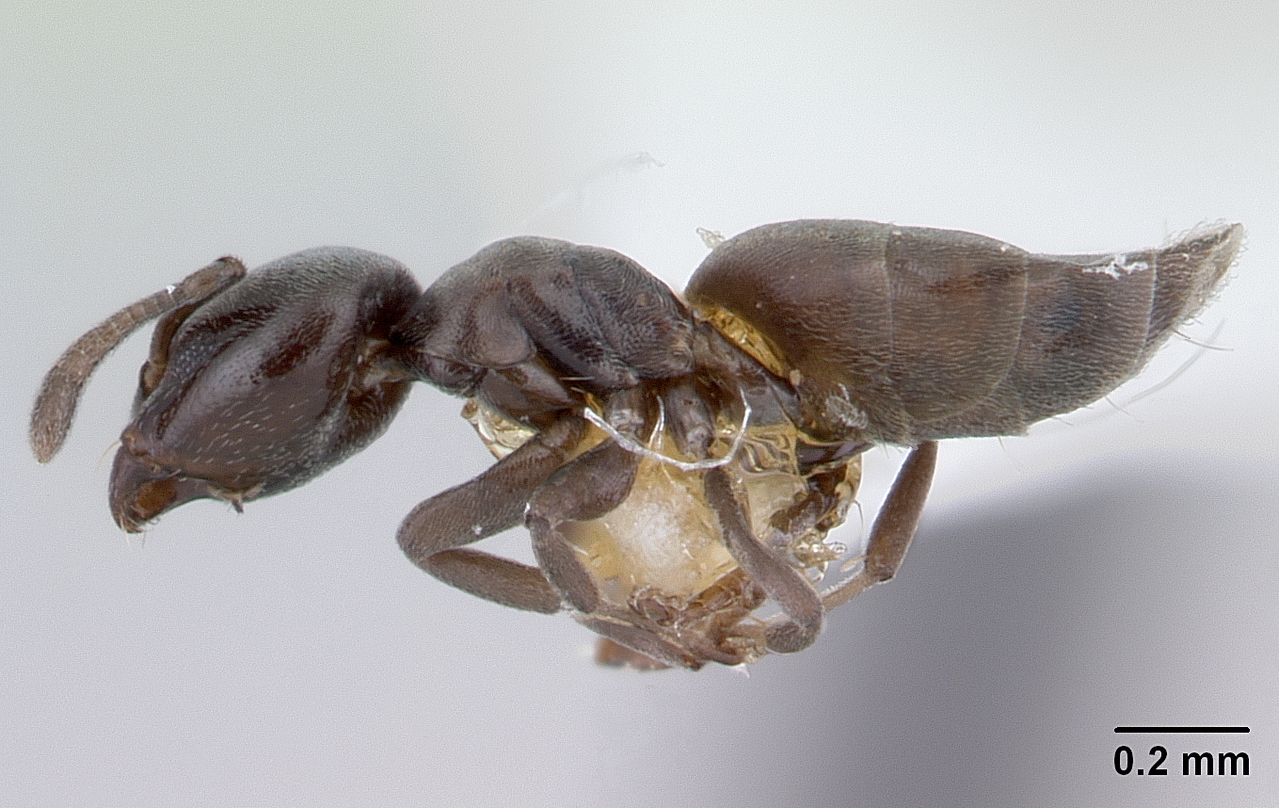

Scientific classification
- Domain: Eukaryota
- Kingdom: Animalia
- Phylum: Arthropoda
- Class: Insecta
- Order: Hymenoptera
- Family: Formicidae
- Subfamily: Dolichoderinae
- Genus: Tapinoma
- Species: T. schultzei

Binomial name
- Tapinoma schultzei (Forel, 1910)

= Tapinoma schultzei =

Species of ant

Tapinoma schultzei is a species of ant in the genus Tapinoma. Described by Forel in 1910, the species is endemic to the Botswana, Kenya and Zimbabwe.
