= Tapinoma danitschi =

Scientific classification
- Domain: Eukaryota
- Kingdom: Animalia
- Phylum: Arthropoda
- Class: Insecta
- Order: Hymenoptera
- Family: Formicidae
- Subfamily: Dolichoderinae
- Genus: Tapinoma
- Species: T. danitschi

Binomial name
- Tapinoma danitschi Forel, 1915

Subspecies
- Tapinoma danitschi bevisi Forel, 1915

Species of ant

Tapinoma danitschi is a species of ant in the genus Tapinoma. Described by Forel in 1915, the species is endemic to South Africa.
