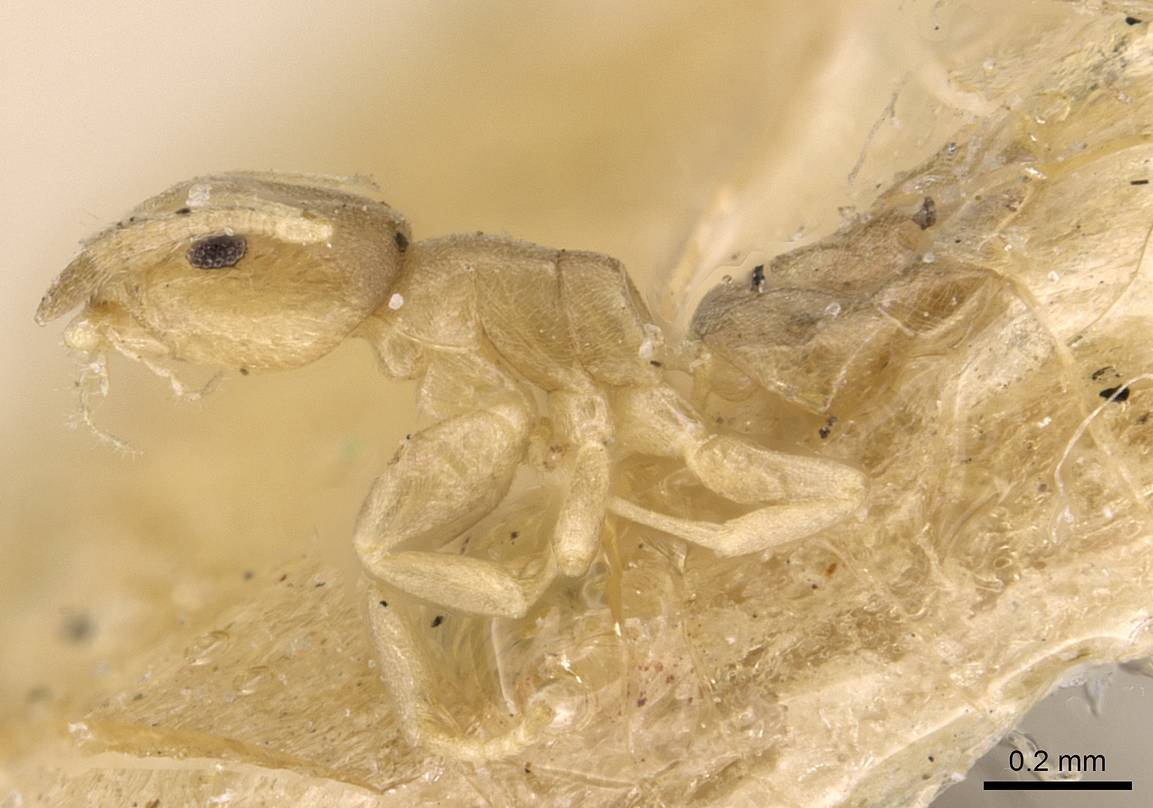

Scientific classification
- Kingdom: Animalia
- Phylum: Arthropoda
- Clade: Pancrustacea
- Class: Insecta
- Order: Hymenoptera
- Family: Formicidae
- Subfamily: Dolichoderinae
- Genus: Tapinoma
- Species: T. andamanense

Binomial name
- Tapinoma andamanense Forel, 1903

Subspecies
- Tapinoma andamanense capsincola Forel, 1911

= Tapinoma andamanense =

Species of ant

Tapinoma andamanense is a species of ant in the genus Tapinoma. Described by Forel in 1903, the species is endemic to India.
