= Tapinoma demissum =

Scientific classification
- Kingdom: Animalia
- Phylum: Arthropoda
- Clade: Pancrustacea
- Class: Insecta
- Order: Hymenoptera
- Family: Formicidae
- Subfamily: Dolichoderinae
- Genus: Tapinoma
- Species: T. demissum

Binomial name
- Tapinoma demissum Bolton, 1995

Synonyms
- Tapinoma gracile Forel, 1913

Species of ant

Tapinoma demissum is a species of ant in the genus Tapinoma. Described by Barry Bolton in 1995, the species is endemic to Tanzania and Zimbabwe.
