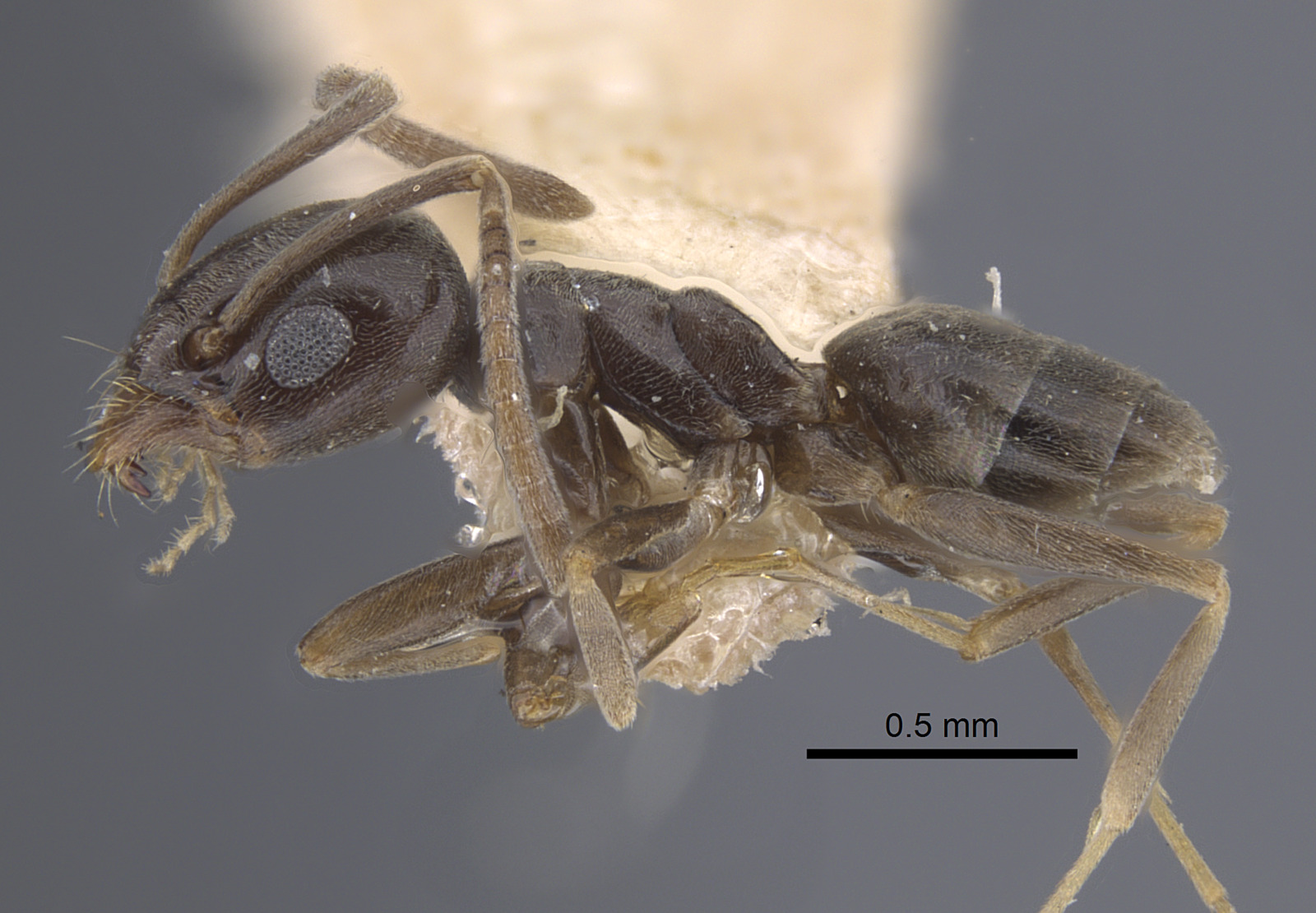

Scientific classification
- Domain: Eukaryota
- Kingdom: Animalia
- Phylum: Arthropoda
- Class: Insecta
- Order: Hymenoptera
- Family: Formicidae
- Subfamily: Dolichoderinae
- Genus: Tapinoma
- Species: T. rectinotum

Binomial name
- Tapinoma rectinotum Wheeler, W.M., 1927

= Tapinoma rectinotum =

Species of ant

Tapinoma rectinotum is a species of ant in the genus Tapinoma. Described by Wheeler in 1927, the species is endemic to China.
