= Tapinoma opacum =

Scientific classification
- Domain: Eukaryota
- Kingdom: Animalia
- Phylum: Arthropoda
- Class: Insecta
- Order: Hymenoptera
- Family: Formicidae
- Subfamily: Dolichoderinae
- Genus: Tapinoma
- Species: T. opacum

Binomial name
- Tapinoma opacum Wheeler, W.M. & Mann, 1914

Species of ant

Tapinoma opacum is a species of ant in the genus Tapinoma. Described by Wheeler and Mann in 1914, the species is endemic to the Dominican Republic, Haiti and other areas in the Greater Antilles.
