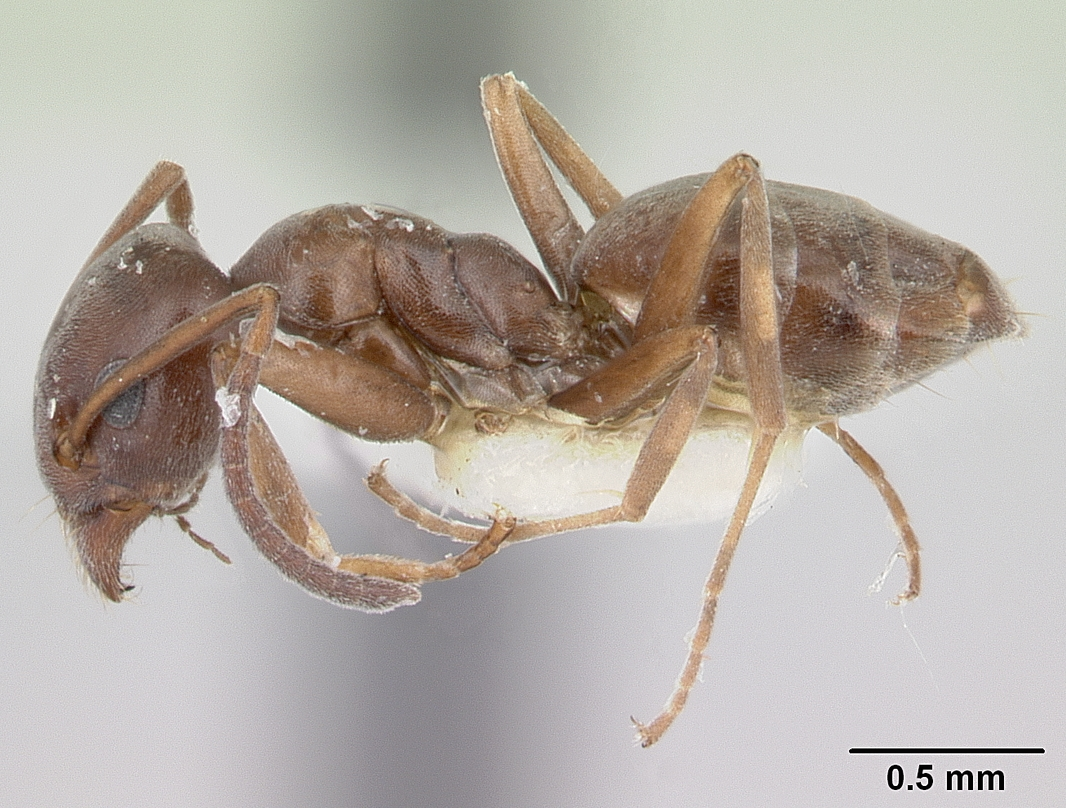

Scientific classification
- Domain: Eukaryota
- Kingdom: Animalia
- Phylum: Arthropoda
- Class: Insecta
- Order: Hymenoptera
- Family: Formicidae
- Subfamily: Dolichoderinae
- Genus: Tapinoma
- Species: T. simrothi

Binomial name
- Tapinoma simrothi Krausse, 1911

Subspecies
- Tapinoma simrothi phoeniceum Emery, 1925

= Tapinoma simrothi =

Species of ant

Tapinoma simrothi is a species of ant in the genus Tapinoma. Described by Krausse in 1911, the species is endemic to many countries spanning in Africa, Asia and Europe.
