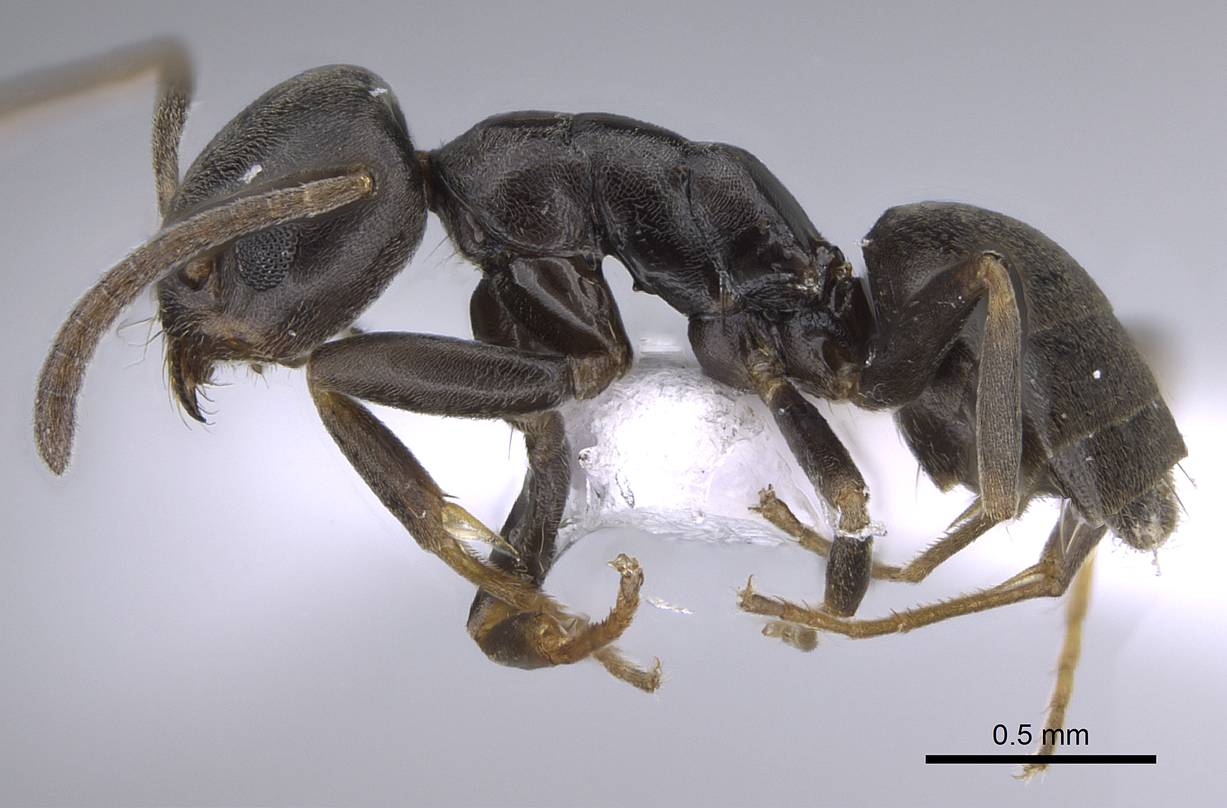

Scientific classification
- Domain: Eukaryota
- Kingdom: Animalia
- Phylum: Arthropoda
- Class: Insecta
- Order: Hymenoptera
- Family: Formicidae
- Subfamily: Dolichoderinae
- Genus: Tapinoma
- Species: T. subboreale

Binomial name
- Tapinoma subboreale Seifert, 2012

= Tapinoma subboreale =

Species of ant

Tapinoma subboreale is a species of ant in the genus Tapinoma. Described by Bernhard Seifert in 2012, the species is endemic to Europe.
