= Tapinoma baculum =

Scientific classification
- Domain: Eukaryota
- Kingdom: Animalia
- Phylum: Arthropoda
- Class: Insecta
- Order: Hymenoptera
- Family: Formicidae
- Subfamily: Dolichoderinae
- Genus: Tapinoma
- Species: †T. baculum

Binomial name
- †Tapinoma baculum Zhang, 1989

Species of ant

Tapinoma baculum is an extinct species of ant in the genus Tapinoma. Described by Zhang in 1989, fossils of the species were found in China.
