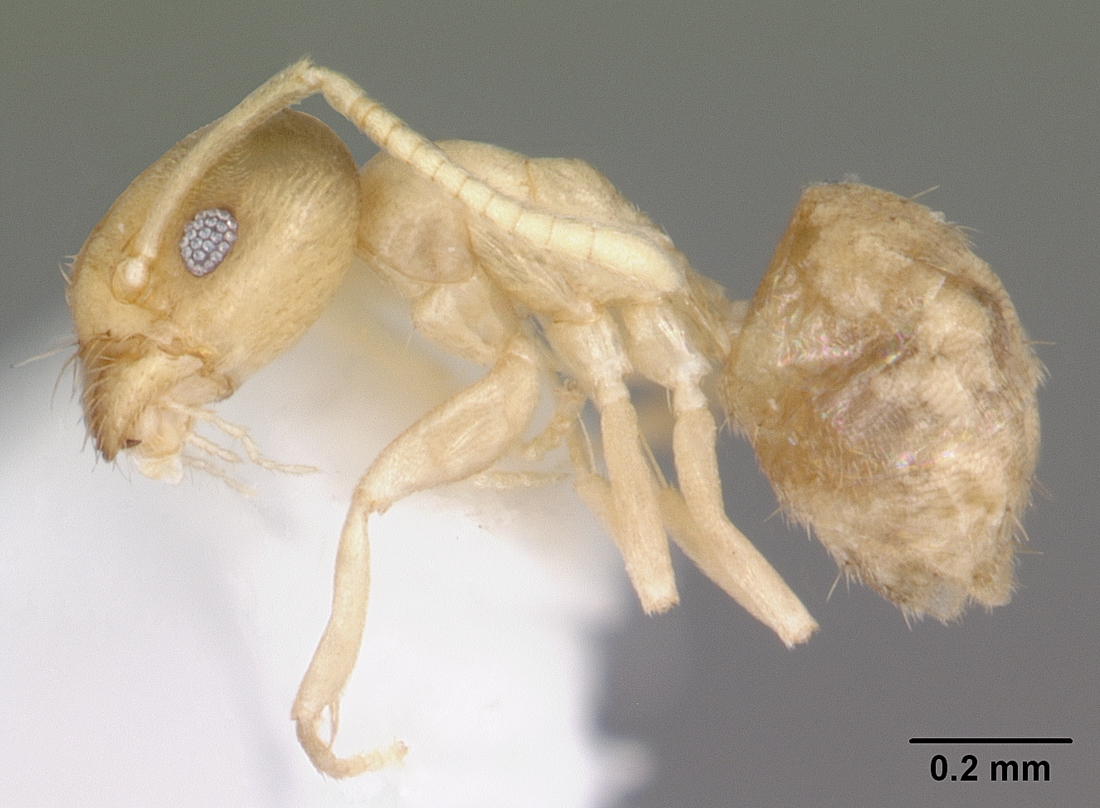

Scientific classification
- Kingdom: Animalia
- Phylum: Arthropoda
- Class: Insecta
- Order: Hymenoptera
- Family: Formicidae
- Subfamily: Dolichoderinae
- Genus: Tapinoma
- Species: T. litorale

Binomial name
- Tapinoma litorale Wheeler, W.M., 1905

Subspecies
- Tapinoma litorale cubaense Wheeler, W.M., 1913

= Tapinoma litorale =

Species of ant

Tapinoma litorale is a species of ant in the genus Tapinoma. Described by William Morton Wheeler in 1905, the species is native to various countries in North America.
