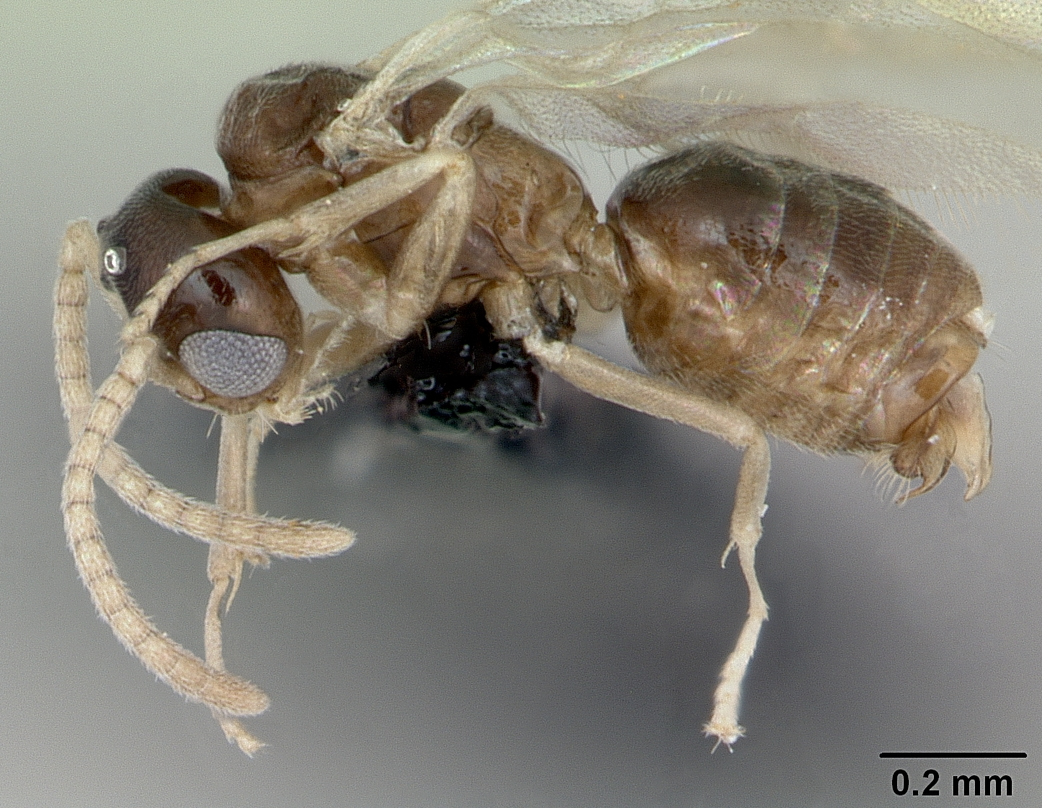

Scientific classification
- Domain: Eukaryota
- Kingdom: Animalia
- Phylum: Arthropoda
- Class: Insecta
- Order: Hymenoptera
- Family: Formicidae
- Subfamily: Dolichoderinae
- Genus: Tapinoma
- Species: T. subtile

Binomial name
- Tapinoma subtile Santschi, 1911

= Tapinoma subtile =

Species of ant

Tapinoma subtile is a species of ant in the genus Tapinoma. Described by Santschi in 1911, the species is endemic to various countries in Africa.
