= Tapinoma muelleri =

Scientific classification
- Domain: Eukaryota
- Kingdom: Animalia
- Phylum: Arthropoda
- Class: Insecta
- Order: Hymenoptera
- Family: Formicidae
- Subfamily: Dolichoderinae
- Genus: Tapinoma
- Species: T. muelleri

Binomial name
- Tapinoma muelleri Karavaiev, 1926

Species of ant

Tapinoma muelleri is a species of ant in the genus Tapinoma. Described by Karavaiev in 1926, the species is endemic to Indonesia.
