= Tapinoma pygmaeum =

Scientific classification
- Domain: Eukaryota
- Kingdom: Animalia
- Phylum: Arthropoda
- Class: Insecta
- Order: Hymenoptera
- Family: Formicidae
- Subfamily: Dolichoderinae
- Genus: Tapinoma
- Species: T. pygmaeum

Binomial name
- Tapinoma pygmaeum (Dufour, 1857)

Synonyms
- Micromyrma dufouri Donisthorpe, 1943; Tapinoma confusum Smith, M.R., 1951

Species of ant

Tapinoma pygmaeum is a species of ant in the genus Tapinoma. Described by Dufour in 1857, the species is endemic to France and Spain.
