= Tapinoma flavidum =

Scientific classification
- Domain: Eukaryota
- Kingdom: Animalia
- Phylum: Arthropoda
- Class: Insecta
- Order: Hymenoptera
- Family: Formicidae
- Subfamily: Dolichoderinae
- Genus: Tapinoma
- Species: T. flavidum

Binomial name
- Tapinoma flavidum André, 1892

Species of ant

Tapinoma flavidum is a species of ant in the genus Tapinoma. Described by André in 1892, the species is endemic to Borneo.
