= Tapinoma rasenum =

Scientific classification
- Domain: Eukaryota
- Kingdom: Animalia
- Phylum: Arthropoda
- Class: Insecta
- Order: Hymenoptera
- Family: Formicidae
- Subfamily: Dolichoderinae
- Genus: Tapinoma
- Species: T. rasenum

Binomial name
- Tapinoma rasenum Smith, D.R. & Lavigne, 1973

Species of ant

Tapinoma rasenum is a species of ant in the genus Tapinoma. Described by Smith and Lavigne in 1973, the species is endemic to Puerto Rico.
