= Tapinoma panamense =

Scientific classification
- Domain: Eukaryota
- Kingdom: Animalia
- Phylum: Arthropoda
- Class: Insecta
- Order: Hymenoptera
- Family: Formicidae
- Subfamily: Dolichoderinae
- Genus: Tapinoma
- Species: T. panamense

Binomial name
- Tapinoma panamense Wheeler, W.M., 1934

Synonyms
- Tapinoma canalis Wheeler, W.M., 1942

Species of ant

Tapinoma panamense is a species of ant in the genus Tapinoma. Described by William Morton Wheeler in 1934, the species is endemic to Panama. These are known to be very small, at lengths of just 1-1.5 millimetres
