= Tapinoma lugubre =

Scientific classification
- Domain: Eukaryota
- Kingdom: Animalia
- Phylum: Arthropoda
- Class: Insecta
- Order: Hymenoptera
- Family: Formicidae
- Subfamily: Dolichoderinae
- Genus: Tapinoma
- Species: T. lugubre

Binomial name
- Tapinoma lugubre Santschi, 1917

Species of ant

Tapinoma lugubre is a species of ant in the genus Tapinoma. Described by Santschi in 1917, the species is endemic to Zimbabwe.
