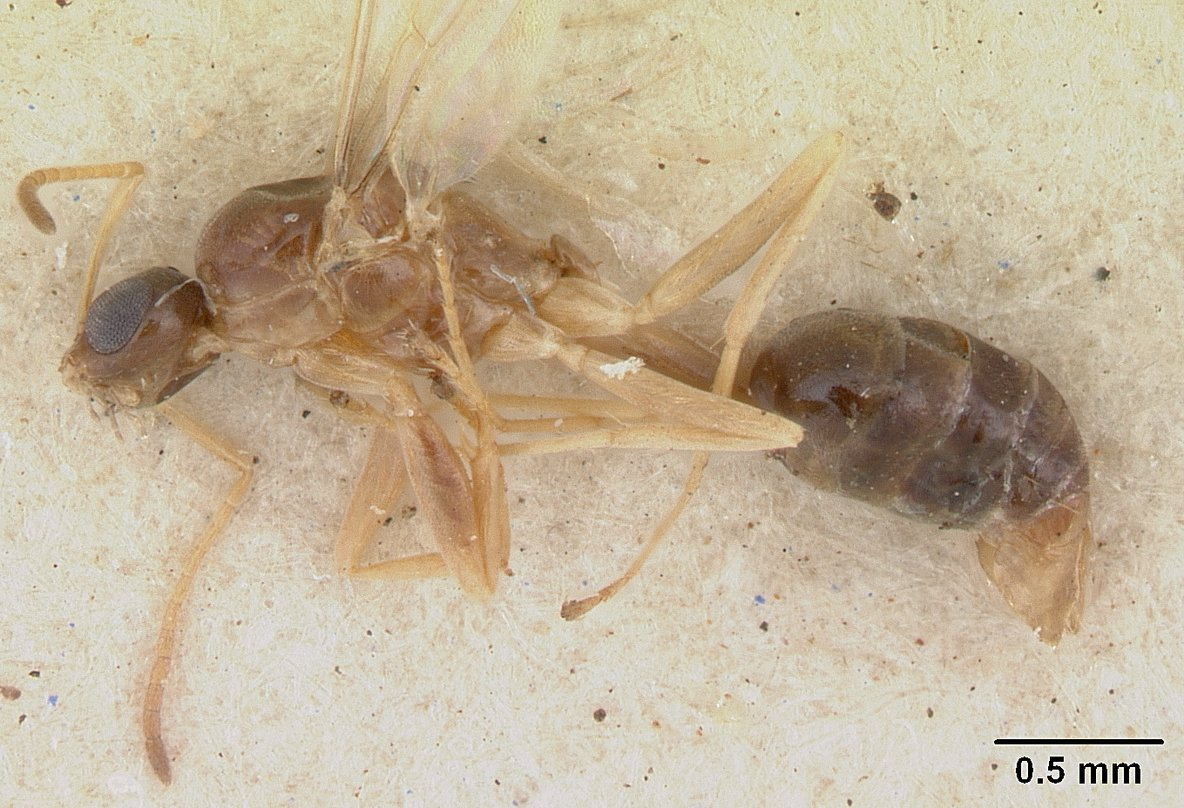

Scientific classification
- Kingdom: Animalia
- Phylum: Arthropoda
- Class: Insecta
- Order: Hymenoptera
- Family: Formicidae
- Subfamily: Dolichoderinae
- Genus: Tapinoma
- Species: T. modestum

Binomial name
- Tapinoma modestum Santschi, 1932

= Tapinoma modestum =

Species of ant

Tapinoma modestum is a species of ant in the genus Tapinoma. Described by Santschi in 1932, the species is endemic to Benin and Zimbabwe.
