= Tapinoma philippinense =

Scientific classification
- Domain: Eukaryota
- Kingdom: Animalia
- Phylum: Arthropoda
- Class: Insecta
- Order: Hymenoptera
- Family: Formicidae
- Subfamily: Dolichoderinae
- Genus: Tapinoma
- Species: T. philippinense

Binomial name
- Tapinoma philippinense Donisthorpe, 1942

Species of ant

Tapinoma philippinense is a species of ant in the genus Tapinoma. Described by Donisthorpe in 1942, the species is endemic to the Philippines.
