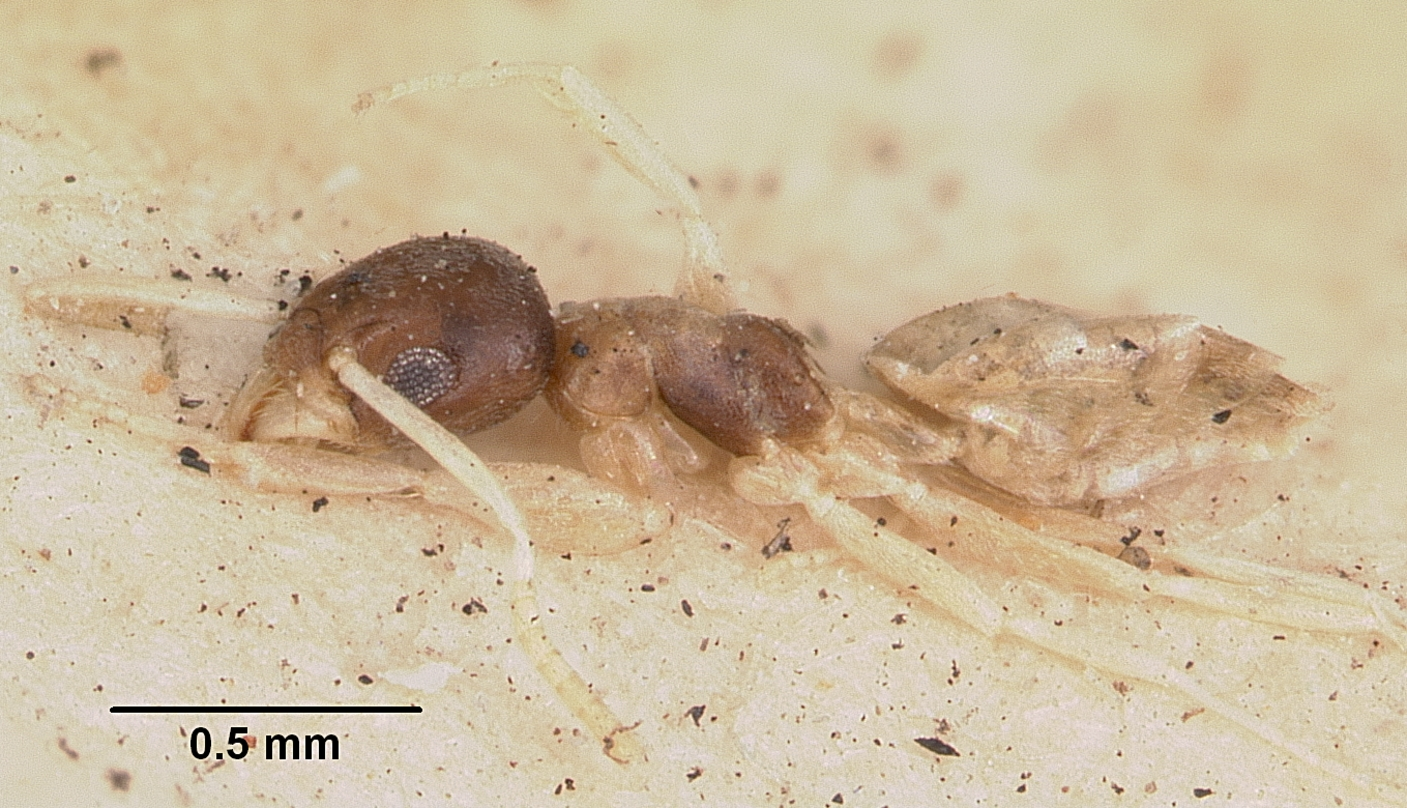

Scientific classification
- Domain: Eukaryota
- Kingdom: Animalia
- Phylum: Arthropoda
- Class: Insecta
- Order: Hymenoptera
- Family: Formicidae
- Subfamily: Dolichoderinae
- Genus: Tapinoma
- Species: T. fragile

Binomial name
- Tapinoma fragile Smith, F., 1876

= Tapinoma fragile =

Species of ant

Tapinoma fragile is a species of ant in the genus Tapinoma. Described by Smith in 1876, the species is endemic to Mauritius.
