= Tapinoma arnoldi =

Scientific classification
- Kingdom: Animalia
- Phylum: Arthropoda
- Clade: Pancrustacea
- Class: Insecta
- Order: Hymenoptera
- Family: Formicidae
- Subfamily: Dolichoderinae
- Genus: Tapinoma
- Species: T. arnoldi

Binomial name
- Tapinoma arnoldi Forel, 1913

Subspecies
- Tapinoma arnoldi tectum Santschi, 1917

Species of ant

Tapinoma arnoldi is a species of ant in the genus Tapinoma. Described by Forel in 1913, the species is endemic to Zimbabwe.
