= Tapinoma glaucum =

Scientific classification
- Domain: Eukaryota
- Kingdom: Animalia
- Phylum: Arthropoda
- Class: Insecta
- Order: Hymenoptera
- Family: Formicidae
- Subfamily: Dolichoderinae
- Genus: Tapinoma
- Species: T. glaucum

Binomial name
- Tapinoma glaucum (Viehmeyer, 1916)

Species of ant

Tapinoma glaucum is a species of ant in the genus Tapinoma. Described by Viehmeyer in 1916, the species is endemic to Singapore.
