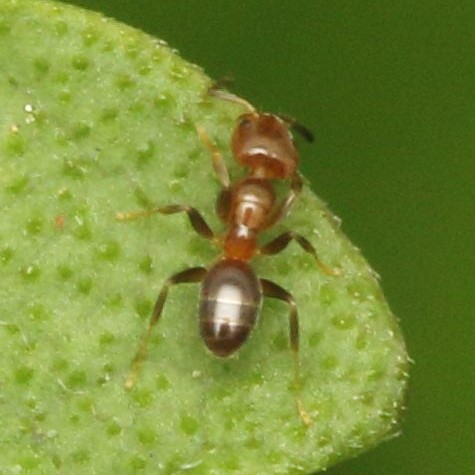

Scientific classification
- Domain: Eukaryota
- Kingdom: Animalia
- Phylum: Arthropoda
- Class: Insecta
- Order: Hymenoptera
- Family: Formicidae
- Subfamily: Dolichoderinae
- Genus: Tapinoma
- Species: T. minimum

Binomial name
- Tapinoma minimum Mayr, 1895

= Tapinoma minimum =

Species of ant

Tapinoma minimum is a species of ant in the subfamily Dolichoderinae. First described by Gustav Mayr in 1895, the species is endemic to Tanzania.
