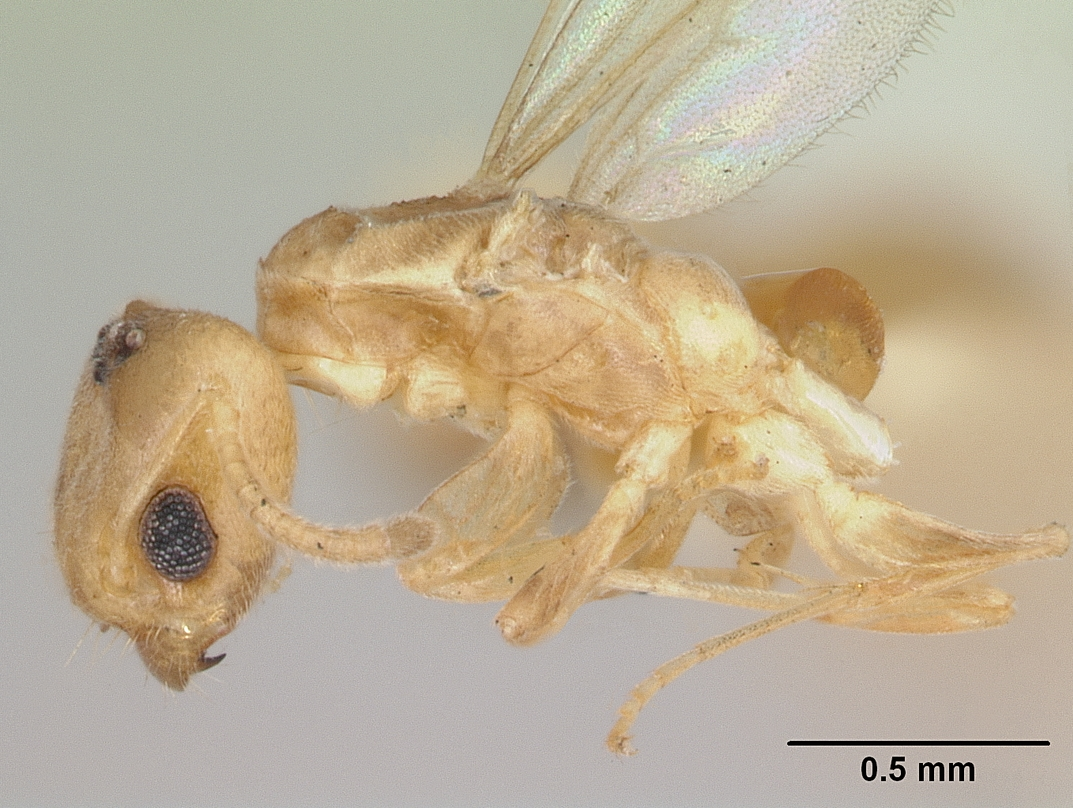

Scientific classification
- Domain: Eukaryota
- Kingdom: Animalia
- Phylum: Arthropoda
- Class: Insecta
- Order: Hymenoptera
- Family: Formicidae
- Subfamily: Dolichoderinae
- Genus: Tapinoma
- Species: T. emeryi

Binomial name
- Tapinoma emeryi (Ashmead, 1905)

= Tapinoma emeryi =

Species of ant

Tapinoma emeryi is a species of ant in the genus Tapinoma. Described by Ashmead in 1905, the species is endemic to Tanzania and Philippines.
