= Tapinoma wheeleri =

Scientific classification
- Domain: Eukaryota
- Kingdom: Animalia
- Phylum: Arthropoda
- Class: Insecta
- Order: Hymenoptera
- Family: Formicidae
- Subfamily: Dolichoderinae
- Genus: Tapinoma
- Species: T. wheeleri

Binomial name
- Tapinoma wheeleri (W. M. Mann, 1935)

Species of ant

Tapinoma wheeleri is a species of ant in the genus Tapinoma. Described by William M. Mann in 1935, the species is endemic to Samoa.
