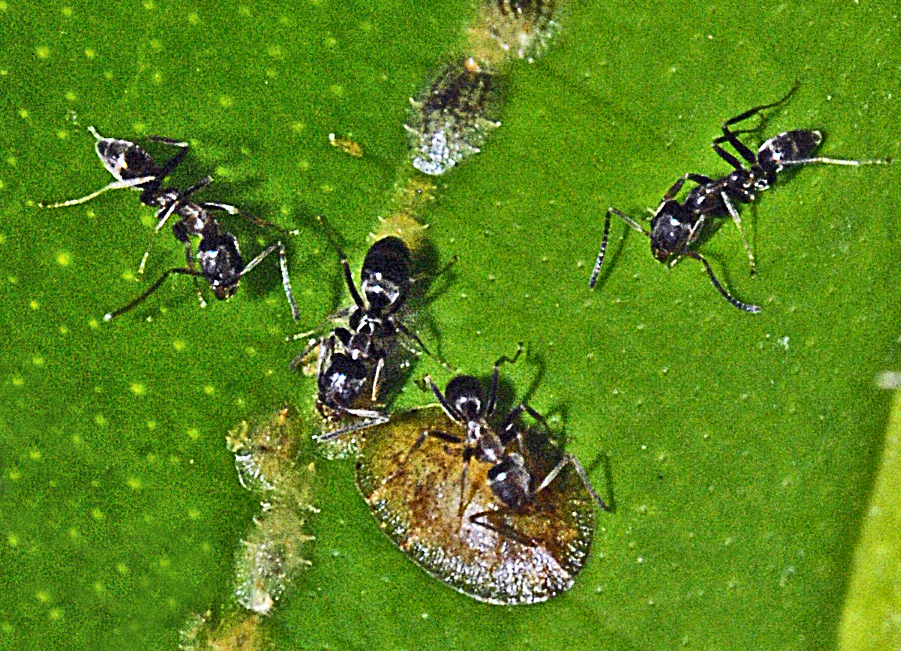
- Tapinoma species

Scientific classification
- Domain: Eukaryota
- Kingdom: Animalia
- Phylum: Arthropoda
- Class: Insecta
- Order: Hymenoptera
- Family: Formicidae
- Subfamily: Dolichoderinae
- Tribe: Tapinomini; Emery, 1913

Genera
- See text

Diversity
- 6 genera 1 extinct genus

= Tapinomini =

Tapinomini Temporal range: Middle Eocene - Recent

Tribe of ants

Tapinomini is a tribe of Dolichoderinae ants with 6 genera and one extinct genus.

== Genera ==
- Aptinoma Fisher, 2009
- Axinidris Weber, 1941
- †Ctenobethylus Brues, 1939
- Ecphorella Forel, 1909
- Liometopum Mayr, 1861
- Tapinoma Foerster, 1850
- Technomyrmex Mayr, 1872
