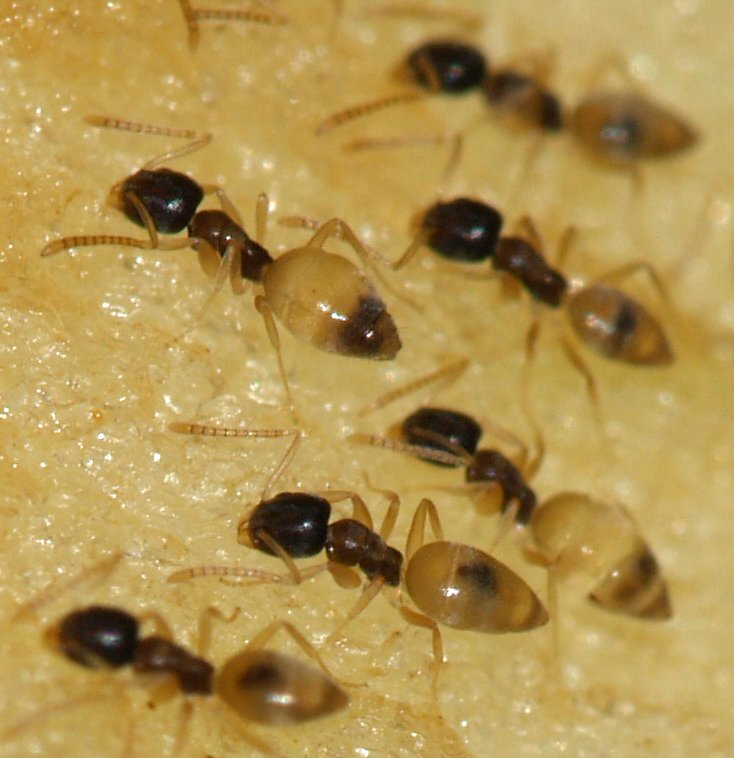
- Tapinoma melanocephalum

Scientific classification
- Kingdom: Animalia
- Phylum: Arthropoda
- Class: Insecta
- Order: Hymenoptera
- Family: Formicidae
- Subfamily: Dolichoderinae
- Tribe: Tapinomini
- Genus: Tapinoma; Förster, 1850

Type species
- Tapinoma collina

Diversity
- 87 species

Synonyms
- Micromyrma Dufour, 1857; Neoclystopsenella Kurian, 1955; Pseudaphomomyrmex Wheeler, W.M., 1920; Semonius Forel, 1910; Zatapinoma Wheeler, W.M., 1928

= Tapinoma =

Genus of ants

Tapinoma (from Greek ταπείνωμα 'low position') is a genus of ants that belongs to the subfamily Dolichoderinae. The genus currently comprises 87 described species distributed worldwide in tropical and temperate regions. Species in the genus are generalized foragers, nesting in a wide variety of habitats, ranging from grasslands, open fields, woodlands, to inside buildings. The majority of species nest in the ground under objects such as stones or tree logs, other species build nests under bark of logs and stumps, in plant cavities, insect galls or refuse piles.

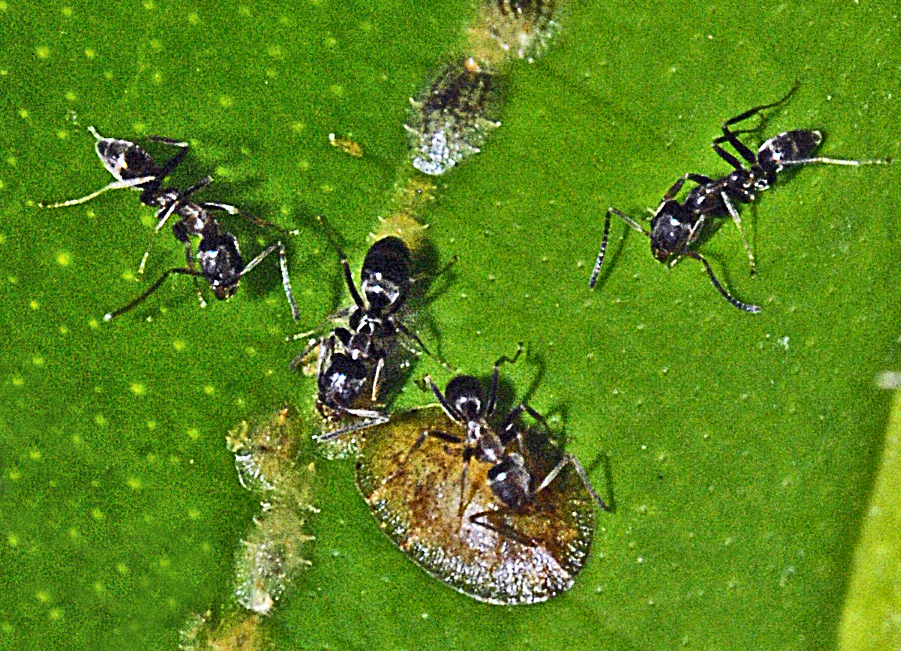
Tapinoma species with Wax scales

== Species ==
As of 2026, Tapinoma contains 87 valid species, including 81 extant and six fossil species.

=== Extant ===
- Tapinoma aberrans (Santschi, 1911)
- Tapinoma acuminatum Forel, 1907
- Tapinoma albinase (Forel, 1910)
- Tapinoma albomaculatum (Karavaiev, 1926)
- Tapinoma amazone Wheeler, 1934
- Tapinoma andamanense Forel, 1903
- Tapinoma annandalei (Wheeler, 1928)
- Tapinoma arnoldi Forel, 1913
- Tapinoma atriceps Emery, 1888
- Tapinoma breviscapum Forel, 1908
- Tapinoma carininotum Weber, 1943
- Tapinoma chiaromontei Menozzi, 1930
- Tapinoma christophi Emery, 1925
- Tapinoma dabashanicum Seifert et al., 2024
- Tapinoma danitschi Forel, 1915
- Tapinoma darioi Seifert et al., 2017
- Tapinoma demissum Bolton, 1995
- Tapinoma emeryi (Ashmead, 1905)
- Tapinoma epinotale Karavaiev, 1935
- Tapinoma erraticum (Latreille, 1798)
- Tapinoma festae Emery, 1925
- Tapinoma flavidum André, 1892
- Tapinoma fragile Smith, 1876
- Tapinoma funiculare Santschi, 1928
- Tapinoma geei Wheeler, 1927
- Tapinoma gibbosum Stitz, 1933
- Tapinoma glabrellum (Nylander, 1849)
- Tapinoma glaucum (Viehmeyer, 1916)
- Tapinoma himalaicum Bharti et al., 2013
- Tapinoma hispanicum Seifert et al., 2024
- Tapinoma ibericum Santschi, 1925
- Tapinoma incognitum Cover & Rabeling, 2024
- Tapinoma inflatiscapus Cover & Rabeling, 2024
- Tapinoma insulare Seifert et al., 2024
- Tapinoma israele Forel, 1904
- Tapinoma jandai Seifert, 2025
- Tapinoma karavaievi Emery, 1925
- Tapinoma kinburni Karavaiev, 1937
- Tapinoma krakatauae (Wheeler, 1924)
- Tapinoma latifrons (Karavaiev, 1933)
- Tapinoma litorale Wheeler, 1905
- Tapinoma lugubre Santschi, 1917
- Tapinoma luridum Emery, 1908
- Tapinoma luteum (Emery, 1895)
- Tapinoma madeirense Forel, 1895
- Tapinoma magnum Mayr, 1861
- Tapinoma melanocephalum (Fabricius, 1793)
- Tapinoma minimum Mayr, 1895
- Tapinoma minutum Mayr, 1862
- Tapinoma modestum Santschi, 1932
- Tapinoma muelleri Karavaiev, 1926
- Tapinoma nigerrimum (Nylander, 1856)
- Tapinoma onaele Shakur et al., 2024
- Tapinoma opacum Wheeler & Mann, 1914
- Tapinoma orthocephalum Stitz, 1934
- Tapinoma panamense Wheeler, 1934
- Tapinoma paxi General & Schoppe, 2025
- Tapinoma philippinense Donisthorpe, 1942
- Tapinoma phoeniceum Emery, 1925
- Tapinoma pomone Donisthorpe, 1947
- Tapinoma pulchellum Cover & Rabeling, 2024
- Tapinoma pygmaeum (Dufour, 1857)
- Tapinoma ramulorum Emery, 1896
- Tapinoma rasenum Smith & Lavigne, 1973
- Tapinoma rectinotum Wheeler, 1927
- Tapinoma sahohime Terayama, 2013
- Tapinoma schreiberi Hamm, 2010
- Tapinoma schultzei (Forel, 1910)
- Tapinoma sessile (Say, 1836)
- Tapinoma shattucki Cover & Rabeling, 2024
- Tapinoma sichuense Seifert et al., 2024
- Tapinoma silvestrii Wheeler, 1928
- Tapinoma simrothi Krausse, 1911
- Tapinoma sinense Emery, 1925
- Tapinoma subboreale Seifert, 2012
- Tapinoma subtile Santschi, 1911
- Tapinoma wheeleri (Mann, 1935)
- Tapinoma williamsi (Wheeler, 1935)
- Tapinoma wilsoni Sharaf & Aldawood, 2012
- Tapinoma wroughtonii Forel, 1904
- Tapinoma yacoubi Sharaf, 2022

=== Extinct ===
- †Tapinoma baculum Zhang, 1989
- †Tapinoma electrinum Dlussky & Perkovsky, 2002
- †Tapinoma glaesaria Perrichot et al., 2019
- †Tapinoma minutissimum Emery, 1891
- †Tapinoma neli Perrichot et al., 2019
- †Tapinoma troche Wilson, 1985
