= Carlo Emery =

Italian entomologist (1848–1925)

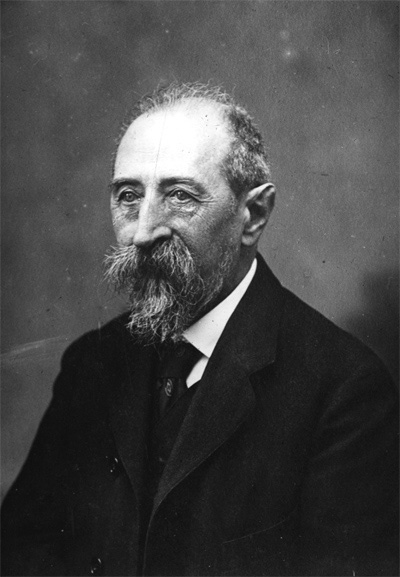
- Born: 25 October 1848; Naples, Kingdom of the Two Sicilies
- Died: 11 May 1925 (aged 76); Bologna, Italy
- Known for: Emery's rule
- Scientific career
- Fields: Entomology
- Workplaces: University of Cagliari, University of Bologna

Carlo Emery (25 October 1848, Naples – 11 May 1925) was an Italian entomologist. He is remembered for Emery's rule, which states that insect social parasites are often closely related to their hosts.

Early in his career Carlo Emery pursued a course in general medicine, and in 1872 narrowed his interests to ophthalmology. In 1878 he was appointed Professor of Zoology at the University of Cagliari, remaining there for several years until 1881 when he took up an appointment at the University of Bologna as Professor of Zoology, remaining there for thirty-five years until his death. Emery specialised in Hymenoptera, but his early work was on Coleoptera. Prior to 1869, his earliest works were a textbook of general zoology and papers on fishes and molluscs. From 1869 to 1925 he devoted himself almost entirely to the study of ants.

Emery published extensively between 1869 and 1926 describing 130 genera and 1057 species mainly in Wytsman's Genera Insectorum series.

Emery's collections of Hymenoptera are in the Museo Civico di Storia Naturale Giacomo Doria in Genoa. His Coleoptera are in Rome's Museo Civico di Zoologia. He died at Bologna in 1925.
