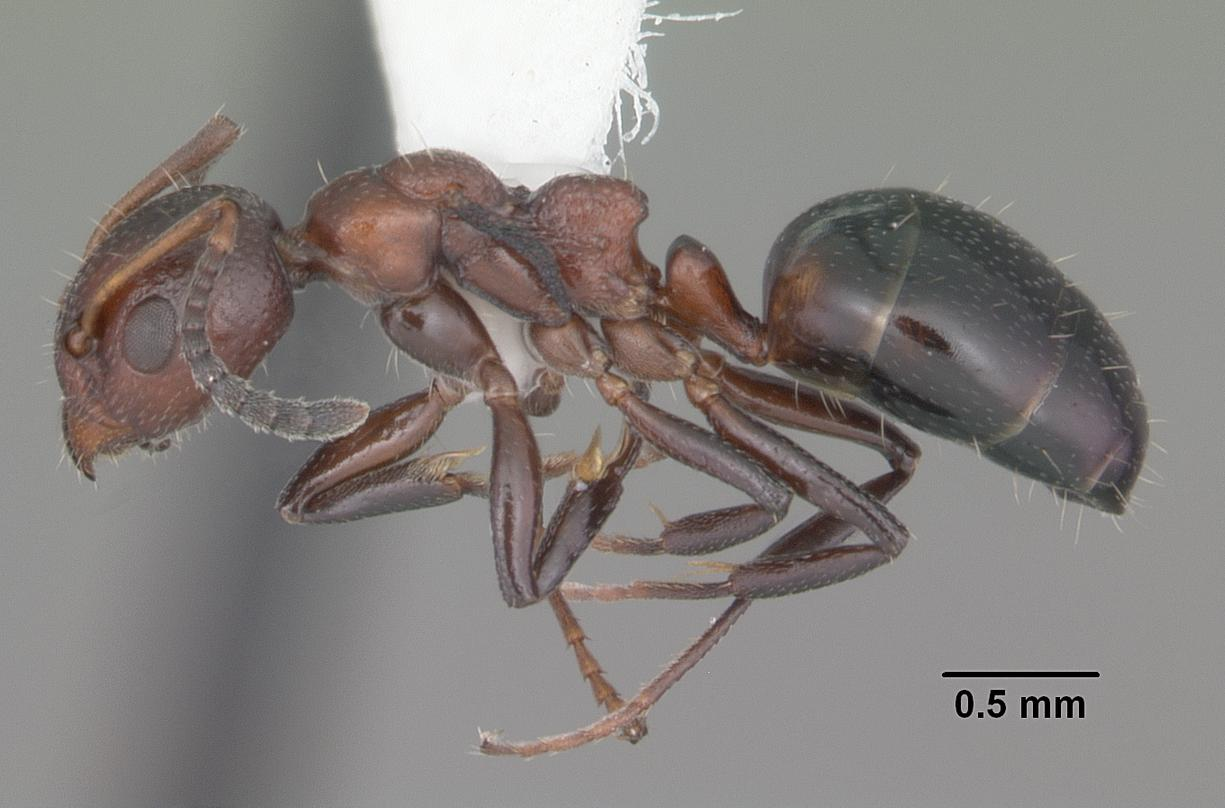
- Dolichoderus pustulatus worker

Scientific classification
- Domain: Eukaryota
- Kingdom: Animalia
- Phylum: Arthropoda
- Class: Insecta
- Order: Hymenoptera
- Family: Formicidae
- Subfamily: Dolichoderinae
- Genus: Dolichoderus
- Species: D. pustulatus

Binomial name
- Dolichoderus pustulatus Mayr, 1886

= Dolichoderus pustulatus =

Species of ant

Dolichoderus pustulatus is a species of ant in the subfamily Dolichoderinae and is found in North America.

== Description ==
In the south of its range, the head, antennae, metasoma and legs of workers of this species are orangish-brown while the gaster is a darker colour. There are sometimes light coloured spots on the first and second segments of the gaster and the antennae and legs become darker as the ant gets older. In the north of its range this ant is more often a single shade of reddish-brown or dark brown. Other distinguishing characteristics include the top of the head, the metasoma and propodeum, being covered by shallow puncture marks. There are a few short hairs near the apex of the gaster and on the legs but mostly this species is hairless. The dorsal surface of the propodeum is nearly one and a half times longer than it is wide. The integument of the petiole and the gaster is smooth and reflective in bright light.

== Distribution ==
This species is found in northern United States and Southern Canada east of the Rocky Mountains. It has been recorded from Nova Scotia westward to Illinois and Oklahoma, in New Jersey and southward to Florida and Mississippi.

== Ecology ==
This species is found in fens, prairies, glades and the edges of woods. The nests are hidden in soil among the roots of plants.

This species has somewhat smaller colonies than Dolichoderus mariae and Dolichoderus taschenbergi. Nests are either built under leaf litter or a thin-walled carton is made from chewed vegetable matter and built around blades of grass. The entrances to the nests are short tubes made from the same substance and look much like the spouts of little teapots.
