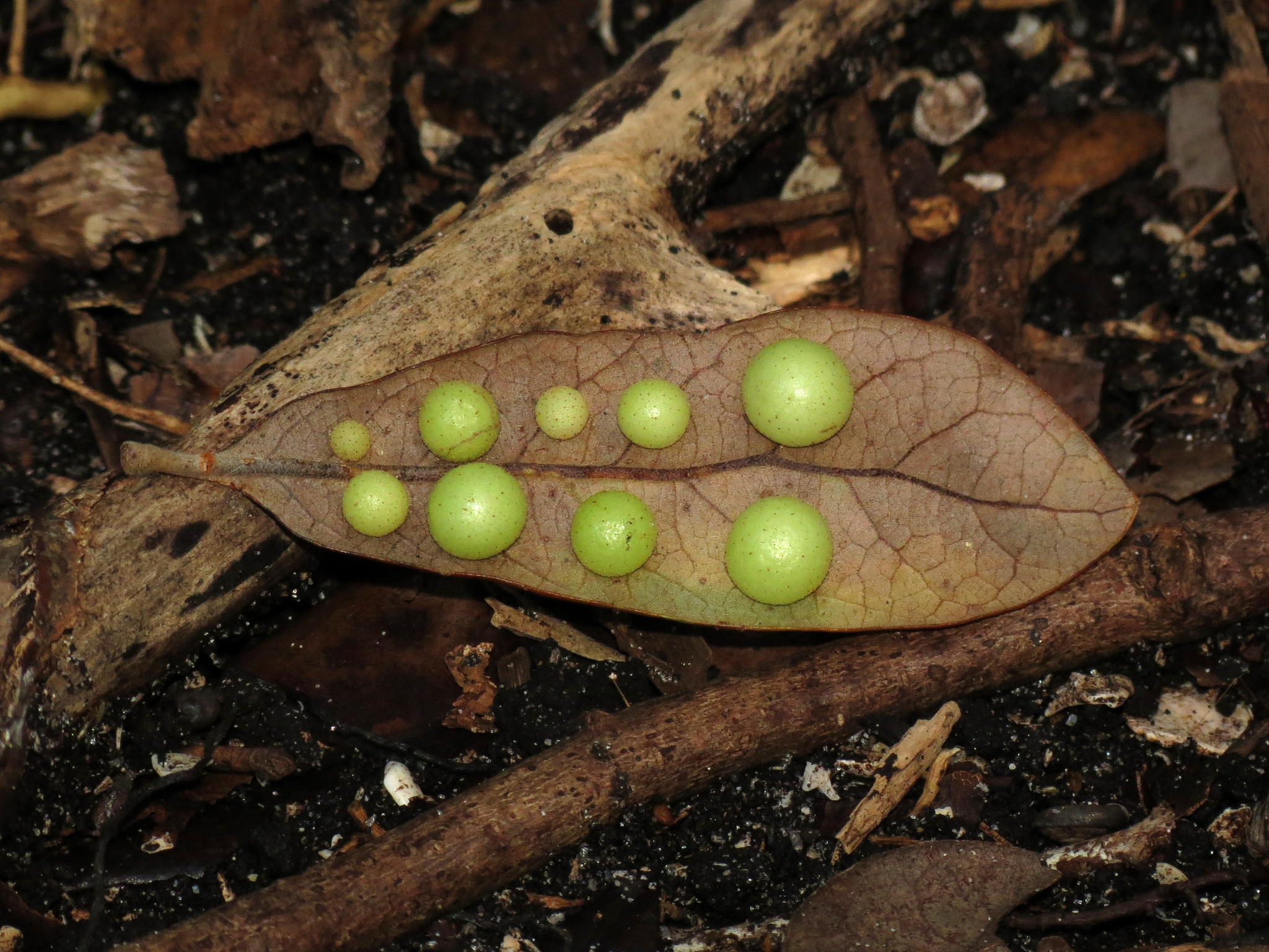
- Asexual galls of Belonocnema treatae

Scientific classification
- Kingdom: Animalia
- Phylum: Arthropoda
- Clade: Pancrustacea
- Class: Insecta
- Order: Hymenoptera
- Family: Cynipidae
- Genus: Belonocnema
- Species: B. treatae

Binomial name
- Belonocnema treatae Ashmead, 1881

Synonyms
- Dryorhizoxenus floridanus Ashmead, 1881

= Belonocnema treatae =

Species of wasp

Belonocnema treatae is a species of gall wasp that forms galls on Quercus virginiana and very rarely Quercus geminata. There are both asexual and sexual generations. The asexual generation forms galls on the underside of leaves while the sexual generation form galls on the roots. This species can be found in the United States, where it is known from Alabama, Florida, Georgia, Mississippi, North Carolina, and South Carolina. It, along with the other described Belonocnema species, has been used to study speciation.

== Taxonomy and phylogenetics ==
Belonocnema treatae was first described in 1881 by Gustav Mayr on the basis of sexual generation adults collected by noted naturalist Mary Treat. She collected the galls in Green Clove Spring, Florida, from root galls growing on Quercus virginiana. Belonocnema treatae was named in honor of her by Mayr. Due to a printing error, the genus first appeared as Belenocnema until it was subsequently corrected.

Later that same year, William Harris Ashmead described individuals from the same galls as Dryorhizoxenus floridanus, but later synonymized this name under Mayr's B. treatae in 1886.

Genetic data places B. treatae as sister to B. fossoria.

== Description ==
The asexual generation galls are smooth, unilocular balls that appear on the ventral side of leaves. Young galls are orange or light brown and darken as they age. The sexual generation galls are irregular shaped, multilocular clusters of galls appearing on small rootlets.

Belonocnema treatae can be distinguished from B. fossoria by the spur on the anterior side of fore tibia being shorter than the basitarsus and tibial spurs in both generations. It can be separated from B. kinseyi in the sexual generation by weakly delimited scutellar foveae separated broadly by a ridge and a distinctive areolet in the asexual generation.

== Distribution and biology ==
The distribution of Belonocnema treatae generally follows that of its main host plant, Quercus virginiana. However, a species turnover occurs in southeast Mississippi, where B. kinseyi replaces B. treatae for the remaining western range of Q. virginiana.

Sexual-generation adults emerge from mid-March to end of April, corresponding with the timing of the leaf flush of Q. virginiana.
