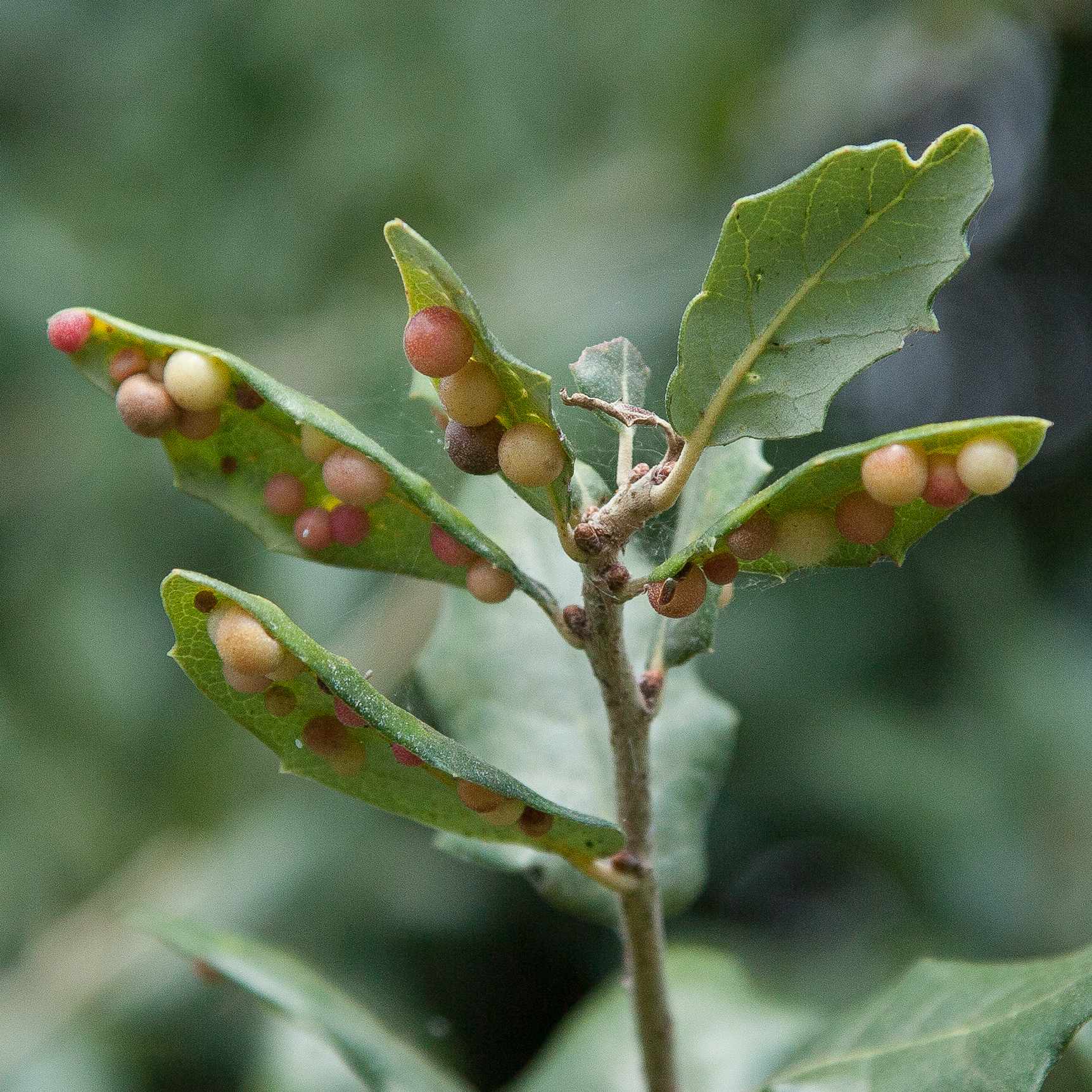
- Asexual galls of Belonocnema kinseyi
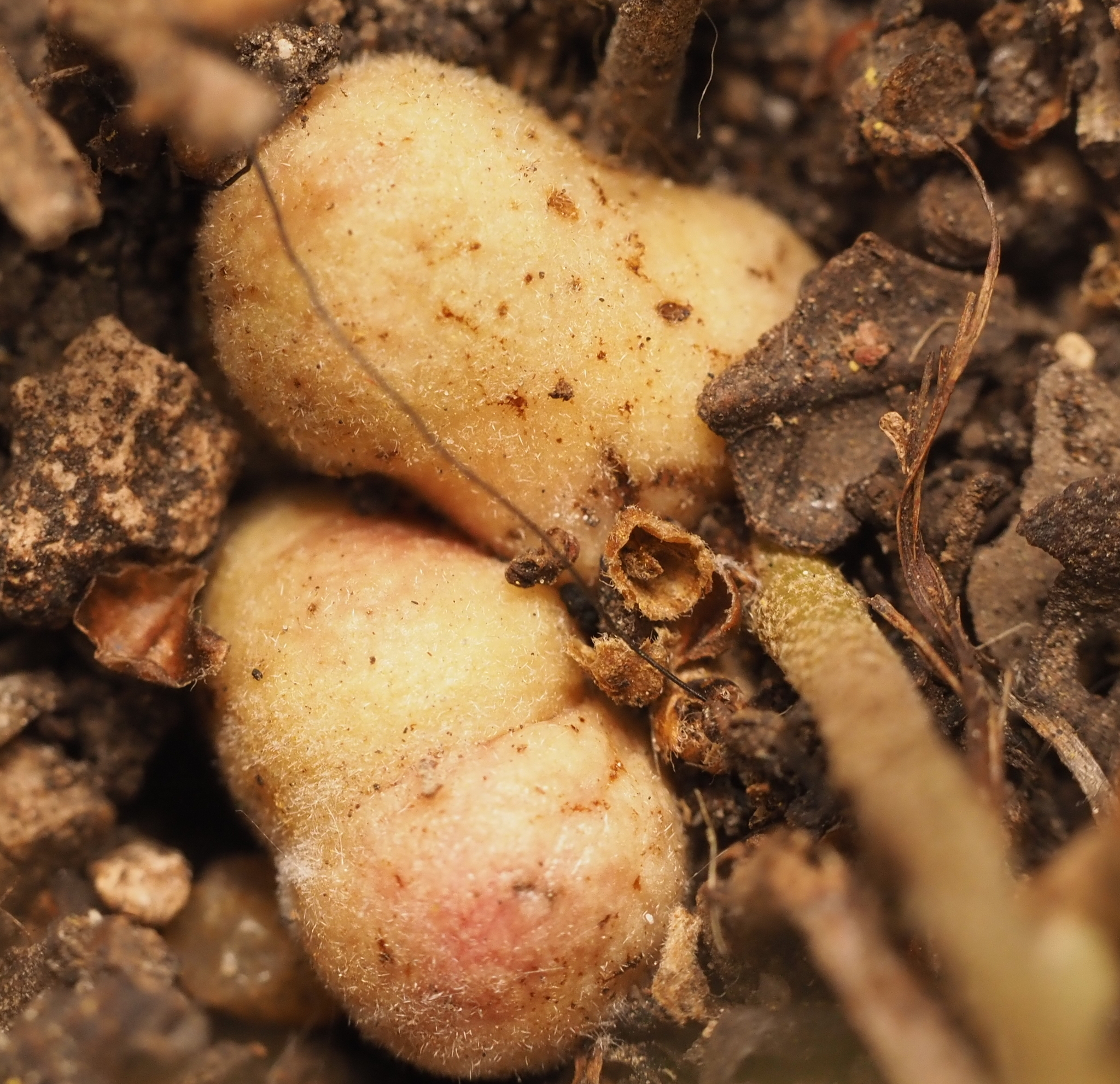
- Sexual generation root gall of Belonocnema kinseyi

Scientific classification
- Domain: Eukaryota
- Kingdom: Animalia
- Phylum: Arthropoda
- Class: Insecta
- Order: Hymenoptera
- Family: Cynipidae
- Genus: Belonocnema
- Species: B. kinseyi

Binomial name
- Belonocnema kinseyi Weld, 1921

Synonyms
- Belonocnema treatae Lund, 1998

= Belonocnema kinseyi =

Species of gall wasp

Belonocnema kinseyi is a species of gall wasp that forms galls on Quercus virginiana and Quercus fusiformis. There are both asexual and sexual generations. The asexual generation forms galls on the underside of leaves whereas the sexual generation form galls on the roots. It can be found in the United States, where it is known from Louisiana, Mississippi, Oklahoma and Texas. It, along with the other described Belonocnema species, have been used to study speciation.

== Taxonomy and phylogenetics ==
Belonocnema kinseyi was first named in 1921 by Lewis Hart Weld based on individuals raised from asexual leaf galls collected on Quercus fusiformis in Boerne, Texas. The specific epithet "kinseyi" honors prominent entomologist and sexologist Alfred Kinsey, who greatly contributed to knowledge of North American gall wasps.

In 1998, it was discovered that the asexual generation described from Texas induced sexual root galls, which at the time was believed to only be associated with Belonocnema treatae. Thus, B. kinseyi was placed as a junior synonym under B. treatae. It was subsequently re-elevated to species status through genetic and morphological analysis in 2021.

Genetic data places Belonocnema kinseyi as an outgroup to a clade containing its sister species B. treatae and B. fossoria. Additionally, A 2022 study investigating the evolutionary relationships within the family Cynipidae used data from B. kinseyi, where it was placed in the phylogeny as sister to Druon quercuslanigerum.

== Description ==
The asexual generation galls are smooth, unilocular balls that appear on the ventral side of leaves. Young galls are orange or light brown and darken as they age. The sexual generation galls are irregular shaped, multilocular clusters of galls appearing on small rootlets.

Belonocnema kinseyi can be separated from B. fossoria by the spur on the anterior side of the fore tibia being shorter than the basitarsus and tibial spur in both sexual and asexual generations. It can also be told apart from B. treatae in the sexual generation by deeply delimited scutellar foveae separated narrowly by a carina, and its reddish brown color as well as indistinctive areolet in the asexual generation.

== Distribution ==
Belonocnema kinseyi can be found in southern Louisiana, southern Mississippi, a small area of Oklahoma and south, central and southeast Texas. This distribution follows that of their host trees, Quercus virginiana and Quercus fusiformis. However, a species turnover occurs in southeast Mississippi, where B. treatae replaces B. kinseyi for the remaining eastern range of Q. virginiana.
