= Crematogaster australis =

Scientific classification
- Domain: Eukaryota
- Kingdom: Animalia
- Phylum: Arthropoda
- Class: Insecta
- Order: Hymenoptera
- Family: Formicidae
- Subfamily: Myrmicinae
- Genus: Crematogaster
- Species: C. australis

Binomial name
- Crematogaster australis Mayr, 1876

Species of ant

Crematogaster australis is a species of ant in tribe Crematogastrini. It was described by Mayr in 1876. The species is native to Australia, as the name australis suggests.
