= Crematogaster corvina =

Scientific classification
- Domain: Eukaryota
- Kingdom: Animalia
- Phylum: Arthropoda
- Class: Insecta
- Order: Hymenoptera
- Family: Formicidae
- Subfamily: Myrmicinae
- Genus: Crematogaster
- Species: C. corvina

Binomial name
- Crematogaster corvina Mayr, 1870

Species of ant

Crematogaster corvina is a species of ant in tribe Crematogastrini. It was described by Mayr in 1870.
