= Crematogaster atra =

Scientific classification
- Domain: Eukaryota
- Kingdom: Animalia
- Phylum: Arthropoda
- Class: Insecta
- Order: Hymenoptera
- Family: Formicidae
- Subfamily: Myrmicinae
- Genus: Crematogaster
- Species: C. atra

Binomial name
- Crematogaster atra Mayr, 1870

Species of ant

Crematogaster atra is a species of ant in tribe Crematogastrini. It was described by Mayr in 1870.
