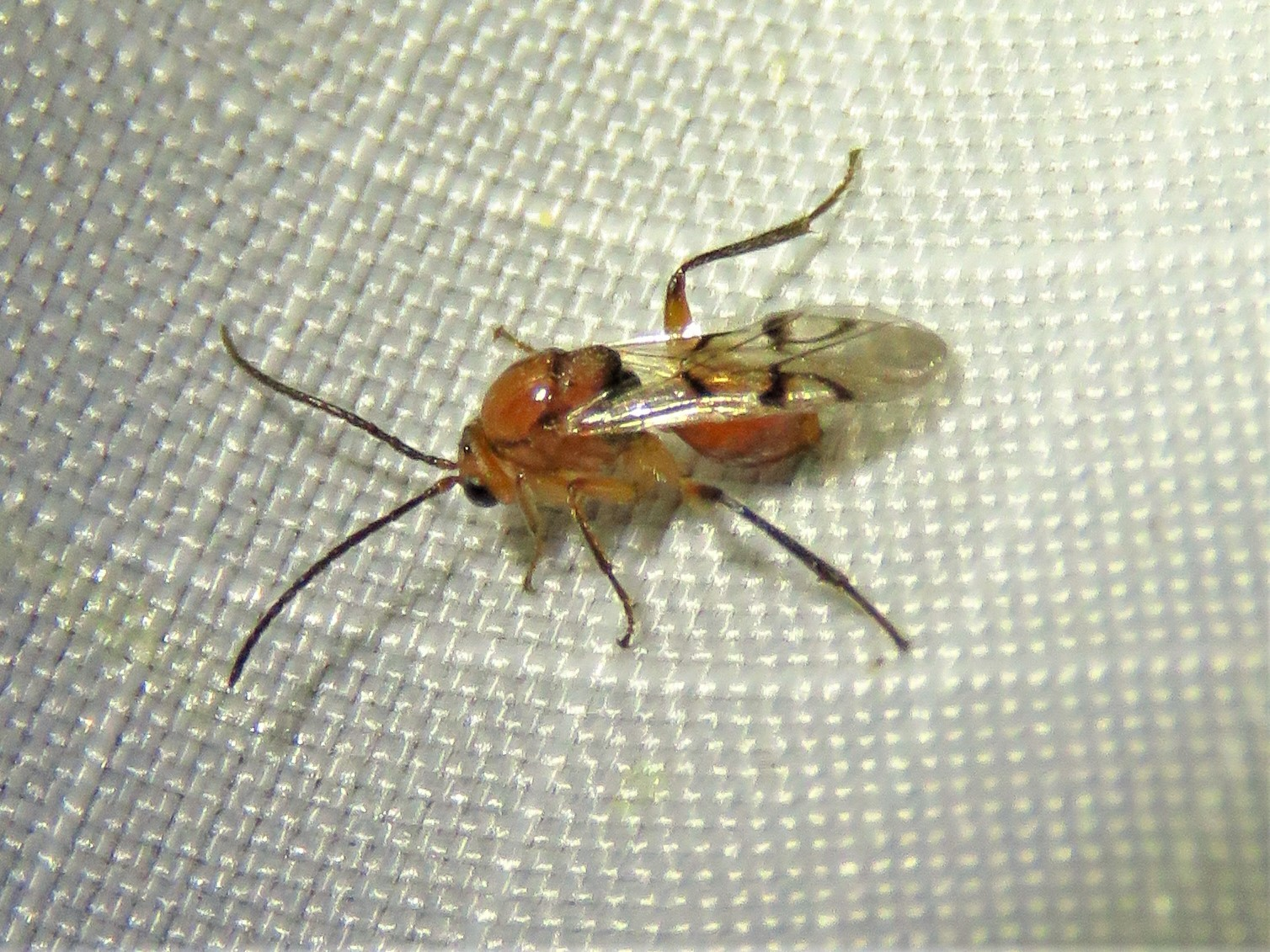
- Belonocnema kinseyi

Scientific classification
- Kingdom: Animalia
- Phylum: Arthropoda
- Clade: Pancrustacea
- Class: Insecta
- Order: Hymenoptera
- Family: Cynipidae
- Tribe: Cynipini
- Genus: Belonocnema; Mayr, 1881

Type species
- Belonocnema treatae Mayr, 1881

Synonyms
- Dryorhizoxenus Ashmead, 1881

= Belonocnema =

Genus of wasps

Belonocnema is a genus of oak gall wasps in the family Cynipidae, found in the United States and Mexico. All species induce galls on section Virentes oaks and have both sexual and asexual generations. The asexual generation galls form as small balls on the underside of leaves, and the sexual galls form on roots. A number of inquiline, parasitoid, and hyperparasitoid wasp species have been reared from Belonocnema galls.

== Taxonomy ==
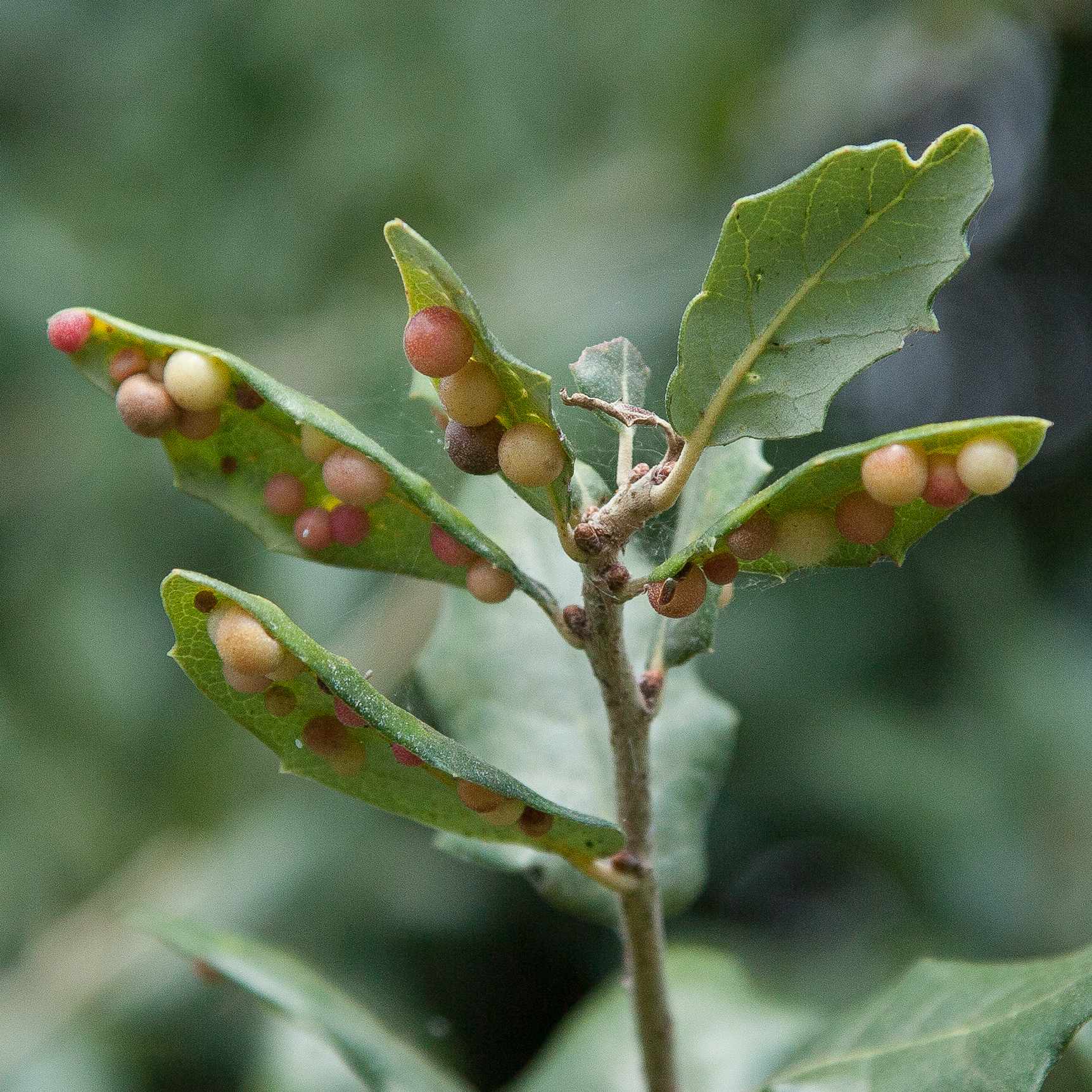
Leaf galls caused by Belonocnema kinseyi

The genus was first named and described by Gustav Mayr in 1881 with Belonocnema treatae as the type species. The taxonomy of the species in the genus has been subject to different interpretations but now appears resolved through study of the morphology, ecology, and genetics of the genus. The genus Dryorhizoxenus, described by William Ashmead, is considered a synonym of Belonocnema, with its type species, D. floridanus, included in B. treatae.

== Species ==
Belonocnema contains the following described species:

- Belonocnema fossoria Weld, 1921
- Belonocnema kinseyi Weld, 1921
- Beloncnema mesoamericana Zhang, Zaldívar-Riverón & Fernández-Flores, 2026
- Belonocnema treatae (Mayr, 1881)
