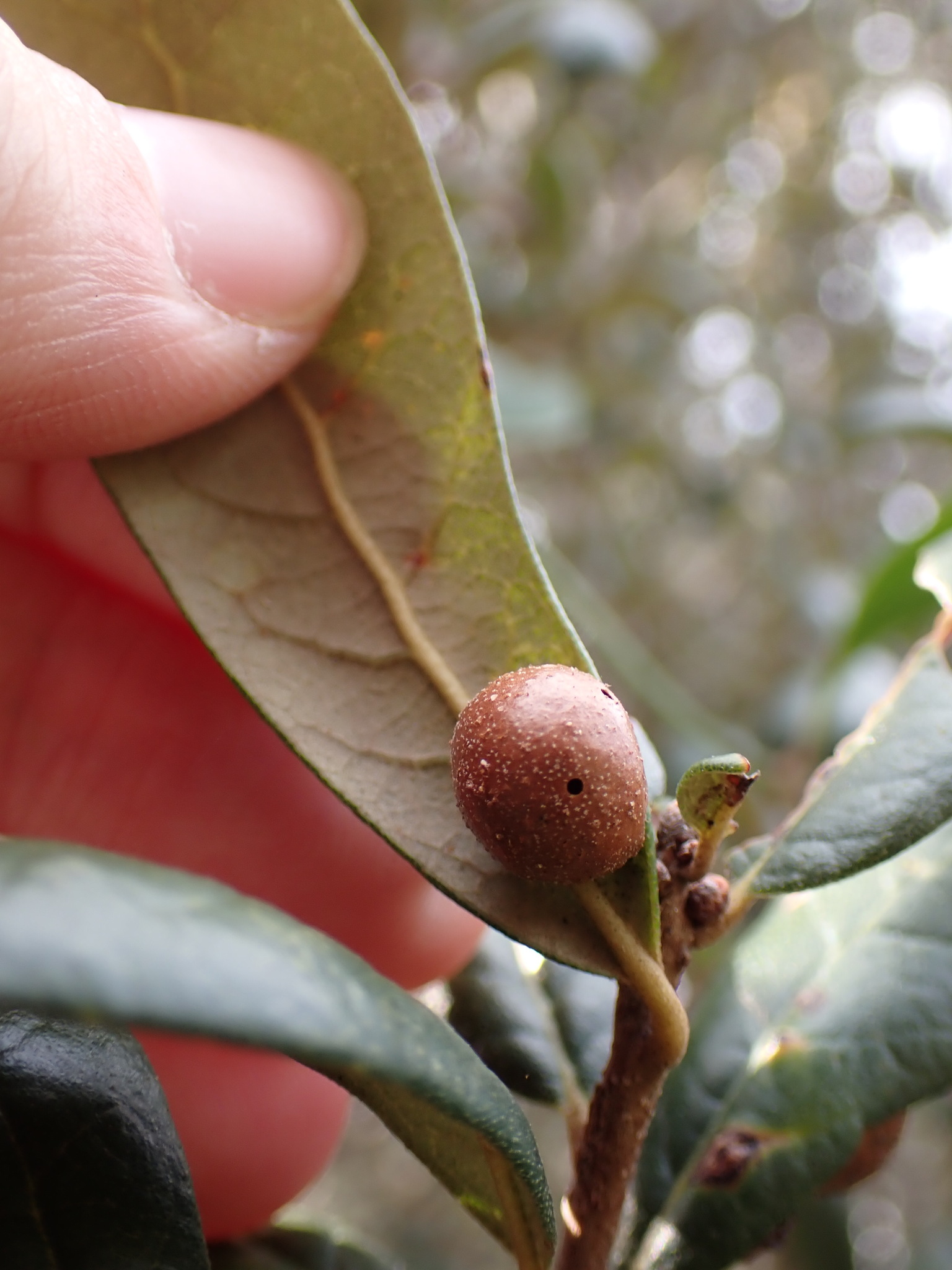
- Belonocnema fossoria asexual gall on Quercus geminata

Scientific classification
- Kingdom: Animalia
- Phylum: Arthropoda
- Clade: Pancrustacea
- Class: Insecta
- Order: Hymenoptera
- Family: Cynipidae
- Genus: Belonocnema
- Species: B. fossoria

Binomial name
- Belonocnema fossoria Weld, 1921

Synonyms
- Belonocnema quercusvirens Burks 1979

= Belonocnema fossoria =

Species of gall wasp

Belonocnema fossoria is a species of gall wasp that forms galls on Quercus geminata. There are both asexual and sexual generations. The asexual generation forms galls on the underside of leaves whereas the sexual generation form galls on the roots. It can be found in the United States, where it is known from Georgia and Florida. It, along with the other described Belonocnema species, have been used to study speciation.

== Taxonomy and phylogenetics ==
Belonocnema fossoria was first named in 1921 by Lewis Hart Weld based on individuals reared from asexual leaf galls collected on Quercus geminata from Clearwater, Florida. In the same work, Weld synonymized Carl Robert Osten-Sacken's 1861 Cynips quercusvirens under B. fossoria. This synonymy was reversed in 1979 by Barnard Burks in his work the Catalog of Hymenoptera in America north of Mexico. B. fossoria was later resurrected as the correct name of the species in 2021.

Genetic data places B. fossoria as a sister species to Belonocnema treatae.

== Description ==
The asexual generation galls are smooth, unilocular balls that appear on the ventral side of leaves. Young galls are orange or light brown and darken as they age. The sexual generation galls are irregularly shaped, multilocular clusters of galls appearing on small rootlets.

Belonocnema fossoria can be distinguished from other members of Belonocnema by a spur on the anterior side of the fore tibia longer than the basitarsus and tibial spurs. The asexual generation has small, non-functional wings, no areolet in the front wing, and the middle tibia has an additional spur.

== Distribution and biology ==
Belonocnema fossoria is only known from Georgia and Florida, following the range of its host plant, Quercus geminata.

The large tibial spur and short, stout legs are likely adaptations to reach rootlets by digging through the sandy soil that Q. geminata often grows in. The sexual generation emerges in early March to mid-April, corresponding to the leaf flush of their host.
