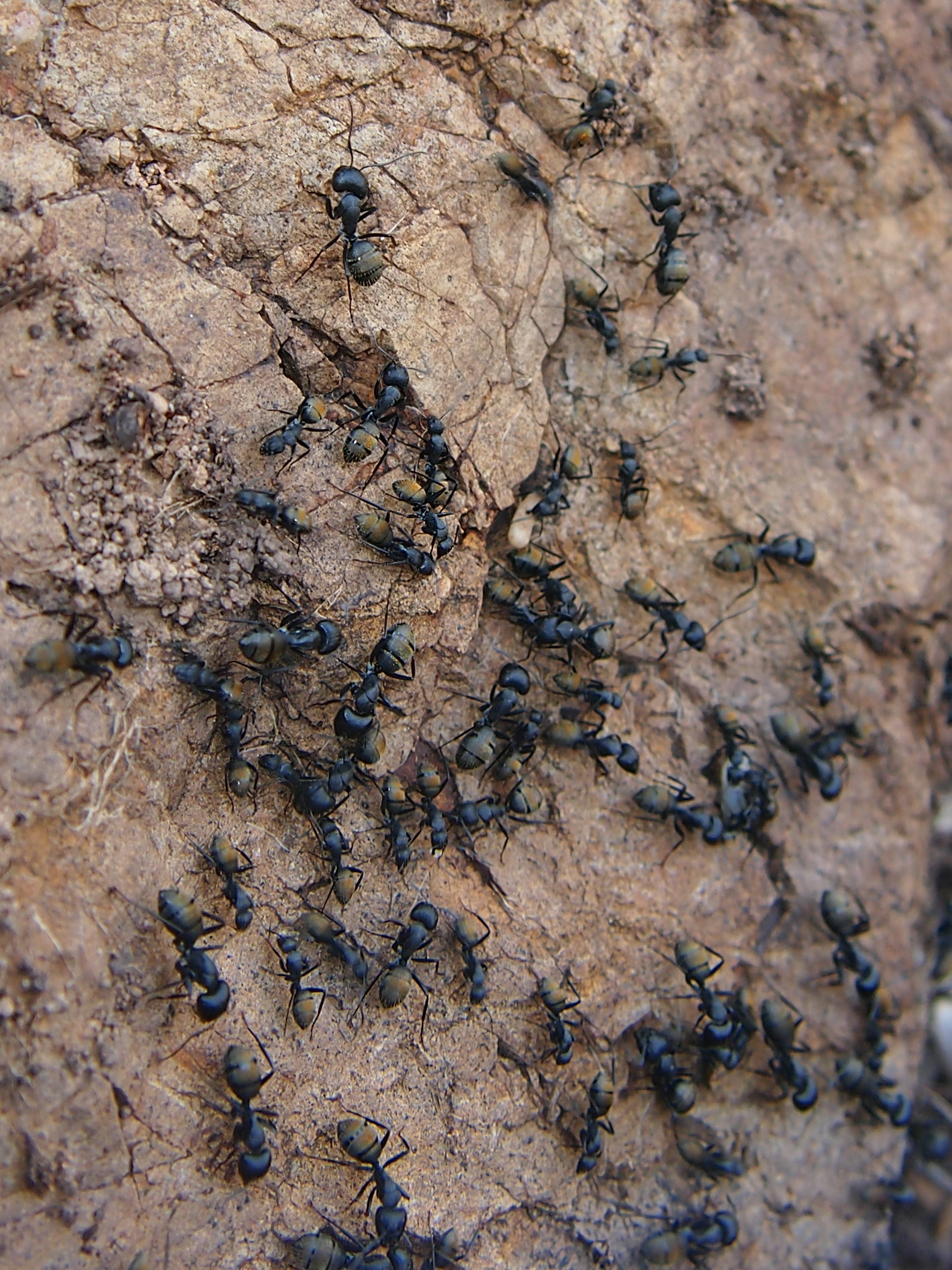
- Group of C. aeneopilosus workers and soldiers

Scientific classification
- Kingdom: Animalia
- Phylum: Arthropoda
- Class: Insecta
- Order: Hymenoptera
- Family: Formicidae
- Subfamily: Formicinae
- Genus: Camponotus
- Subgenus: Myrmophyma
- Species: C. aeneopilosus

Binomial name
- Camponotus aeneopilosus Mayr, 1862

Subspecies
- Camponotus aeneopilosus flavidopubescens Forel, 1902

= Golden tail sugar ant =

Species of Australian ant (Camponotus aeneopilosus)

The golden tail sugar ant (Camponotus aeneopilosus or also commonly known as the golden black sugar ant) is a species of ant in the genus Camponotus. It is native to eastern Australia and was described by Gustav Mayr in 1862.

== Description ==
The golden tail sugar ant is a polymorphic species, meaning that workers vary in size. It is a relatively small species, with lengths ranging from 5 to 9 millimetres (0.20 to 0.35 in). The ants are almost entirely black, with the exception of their gaster which has a covering of golden hairs, and also resembles some species of spiny ants, but they lack the spines that are on the mesosoma.

== Distribution ==
The golden tail sugar ant is commonly found in forests and woodlands in eastern Australia, where they are found nesting under soil, rocks and sometimes logs. They are only active during the day. CSIRO claims these ants have only been known from New South Wales and the Australian Capital Territory, while their presence in other states and territories are yet to be verified.

== See also ==
- List of ants of Australia
- List of Camponotus species
