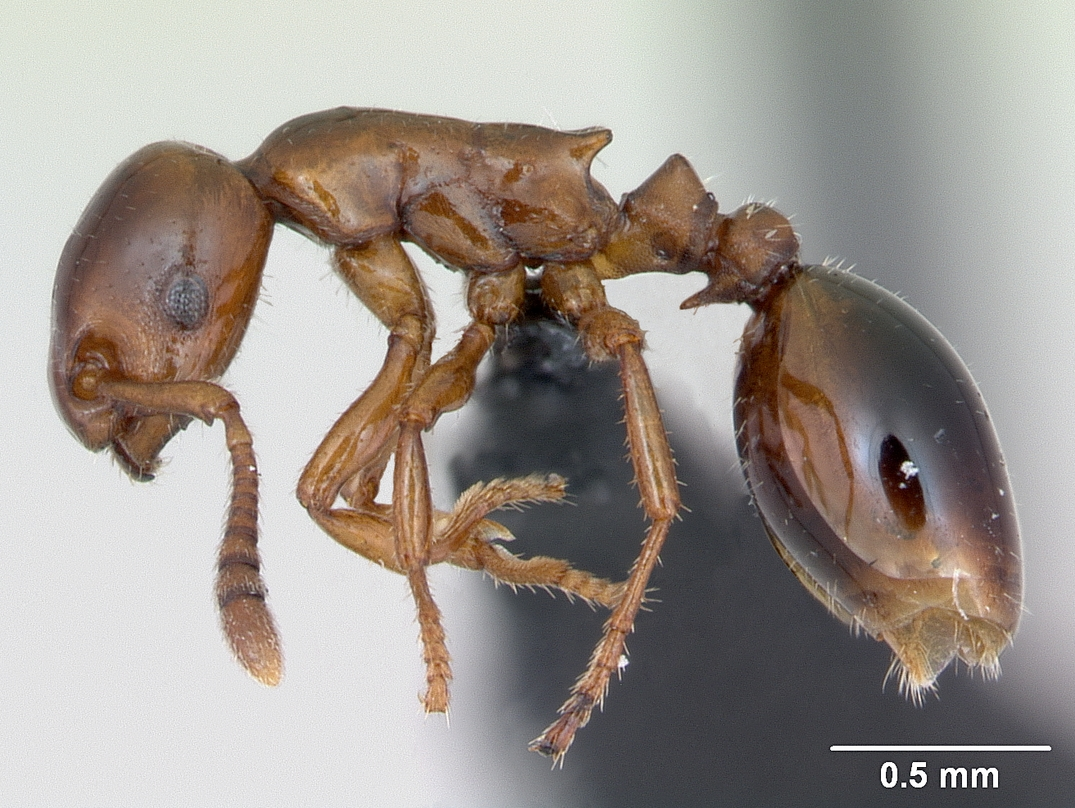
- Formicoxenus nitidulus antweb.org specimen

Conservation status
- Vulnerable (IUCN 3.1)

Scientific classification
- Kingdom: Animalia
- Phylum: Arthropoda
- Class: Insecta
- Order: Hymenoptera
- Family: Formicidae
- Subfamily: Myrmicinae
- Genus: Formicoxenus
- Species: F. nitidulus

Binomial name
- Formicoxenus nitidulus (Nylander, 1846)

Synonyms
- Myrmica nitidula Nylander, 1846

= Formicoxenus nitidulus =

Species of ant

Formicoxenus nitidulus, or the shining guest ant, is a species of ant in the subfamily Myrmicinae. It is found in Austria, Denmark, Finland, France, Germany, Great Britain, Italy, Norway, Poland, Russia, Spain, Sweden, and Switzerland. The International Union for Conservation of Nature has assessed it as being a vulnerable species.

== Description ==
It is a very small ant, about 2–3 mm long, with a brown-red body, similar in shade to the Formica ants that it nests with, but the body is noticeably shiny. The ants move about quickly on the surface of the nest, dwarfed by the much larger wood ants.

== Distribution and habitat ==
The shining guest ant has a wide distribution in Northern Europe and Asia. Its range extends from Spain and North Italy to Scandinavia and eastern Siberia. In the British Isles it is known from Scotland, but not England, Wales or Ireland. Its habitats are wherever its host ants are found, largely in coniferous forests.

== Ecology ==
This ant is known as the shining guest ant because it cohabits with various species of wood ants, including Formica aquilonia and Formica lugubris. The relationships between the Formicoxenus nitidulus and their hosts are poorly known. They seem to rear their own brood in a separate nest connected to their host's nest. The guest ants exit to the open air via passages from their nest, and here the individual guest ant workers solicit food from wood ant workers returning to the nest, or intercept the food while it is being transferred between these workers. There may be several guest ant nests inside one wood ant nest, each with its own queen and a few dozen workers. There is no nuptial flight for this species, reproductives attracting each other on the surface by the release of pheromones.
