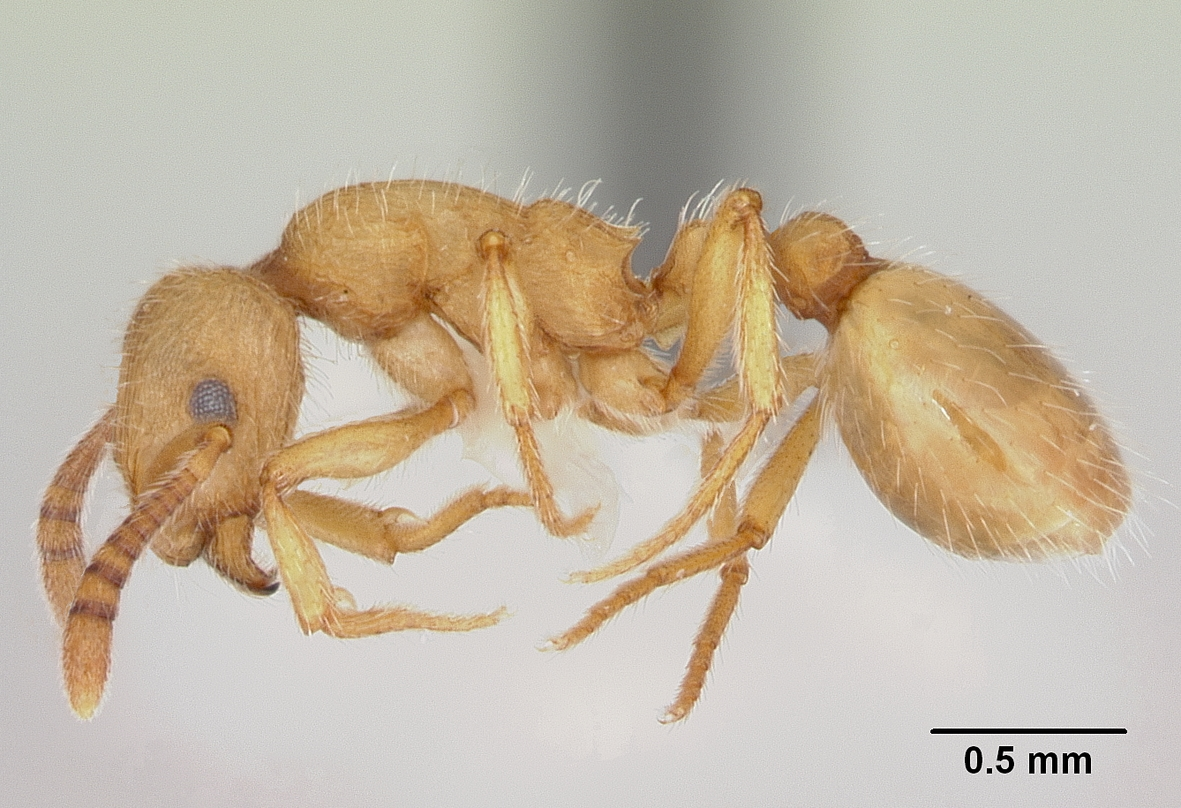
- Formicoxenus chamberlini worker

Scientific classification
- Kingdom: Animalia
- Phylum: Arthropoda
- Class: Insecta
- Order: Hymenoptera
- Family: Formicidae
- Subfamily: Myrmicinae
- Tribe: Crematogastrini
- Genus: Formicoxenus; Mayr, 1855

Type species
- Myrmica nitidula Nylander, 1846

Diversity
- 7 species

Synonyms
- Symmyrmica Wheeler, 1904

= Formicoxenus =

Genus of ants

Formicoxenus is a genus of ants in the subfamily Myrmicinae.

== Species ==
- Formicoxenus chamberlini (Wheeler, 1904)
- Formicoxenus diversipilosus (Smith, 1939)
- Formicoxenus hirticornis (Emery, 1895)
- Formicoxenus nitidulus (Nylander, 1846)
- Formicoxenus provancheri (Emery, 1895)
- Formicoxenus quebecensis Francoeur, Loiselle & Buschinger, 1985
- Formicoxenus sibiricus (Forel, 1899)
