= Mary Treat =

American biologist (1830–1923)

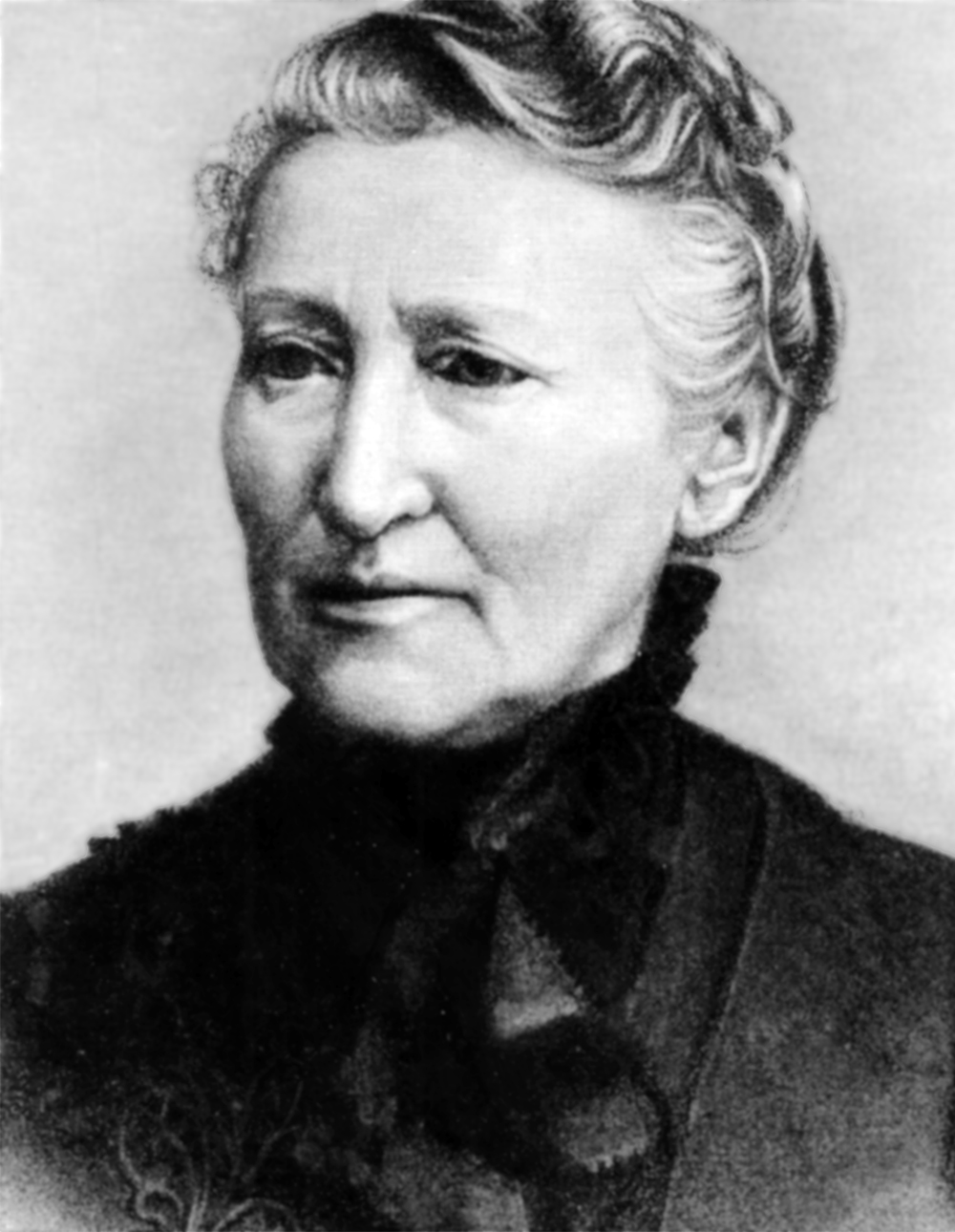
- Born: Mary Davis; September 7, 1830; Trumansburg, New York
- Died: April 11, 1923 (aged 92); Pembroke, New York
- Occupations: naturalist and botanist, entomologist, author

Mary Lua Adelia Treat (née Davis; September 7, 1830 – April 11, 1923) was an American naturalist, writer, and correspondent of Charles Darwin. Treat's contributions to both botany and entomology were extensive. She discovered five species of plants and animals that were named for her, including an amaryllis called Zephyranthes treatae, an oak gall wasp species called Belonocnema treatae, and three ant species - Aphaenogaster mariae, Aphaenogaster treatae, and Dolichoderus mariae.

== Early life ==
Treat was born Mary Davis to a middle-class family in Trumansburg, New York. At nine years old, she moved with her family to Ohio, where she attended public and private girls' schools. Davis married Dr. Joseph Burrell Treat, an abolitionist and lecturer, in 1863. The couple lived in Iowa until 1868, when they moved to Vineland, New Jersey.

== Career and research ==
After moving to New Jersey, Treat began her scientific studies in earnest, and collaborated with her husband on entomological articles and research. Treat’s first scientific article was a note published in The American Entomologist when she was 39 years old. Over 28 years, she wrote 76 scientific and popular articles as well as five books. Her research quickly expanded from entomology to ornithology and botany, detailing bird and plant life in the southern New Jersey region and specifically the Pine Barrens.

Following her separation from her husband in 1874, Treat supported herself by publishing popular science articles for periodicals such as Harpers and Queen. Beginning in 1870, she published popular naturalist pieces in Garden and Forest, Hearth and Home, Harper's, and Lippincott's.

In 1882, Treat published the book Injurious Insects of the Farm and Field, which was reprinted five times. She also collected plants and insects for other researchers, including Asa Gray, through whom she was introduced to Charles Darwin. Treat wrote letters to engage in botanical and entomological discourse not only with Darwin and Gray, but Auguste Forel and Gustav Mayr as well. She traveled to Florida several times between 1876 and 1878 to investigate insectivorous plants further. On one of these trips, she discovered the amaryllis species Zephyranthes treatae (named after her by Sereno Watson) and discovered that another plant was not extinct.

For her contributions to the field of entomology, Samuel Hubbard Scudder made Treat a member of the Cambridge Entomological Society.

=== Collaboration with Charles Darwin ===
The first recorded correspondence between Treat and Darwin originates from 20 December 1871 in which Treat describes the fly-catching activities of Drosera, commonly known as sundew plants. Treat and Darwin’s recorded correspondence extends over five years around the period of time when Darwin was researching, and then publishing, on carnivorous plants. They predominantly discuss these plants in their correspondence (although not the only theme, they also discussed controlling sex in butterflies), and Treat openly critiqued Darwin’s hypotheses. One notable exchange concerned the bladderwort plant, Utricularia clandestina.

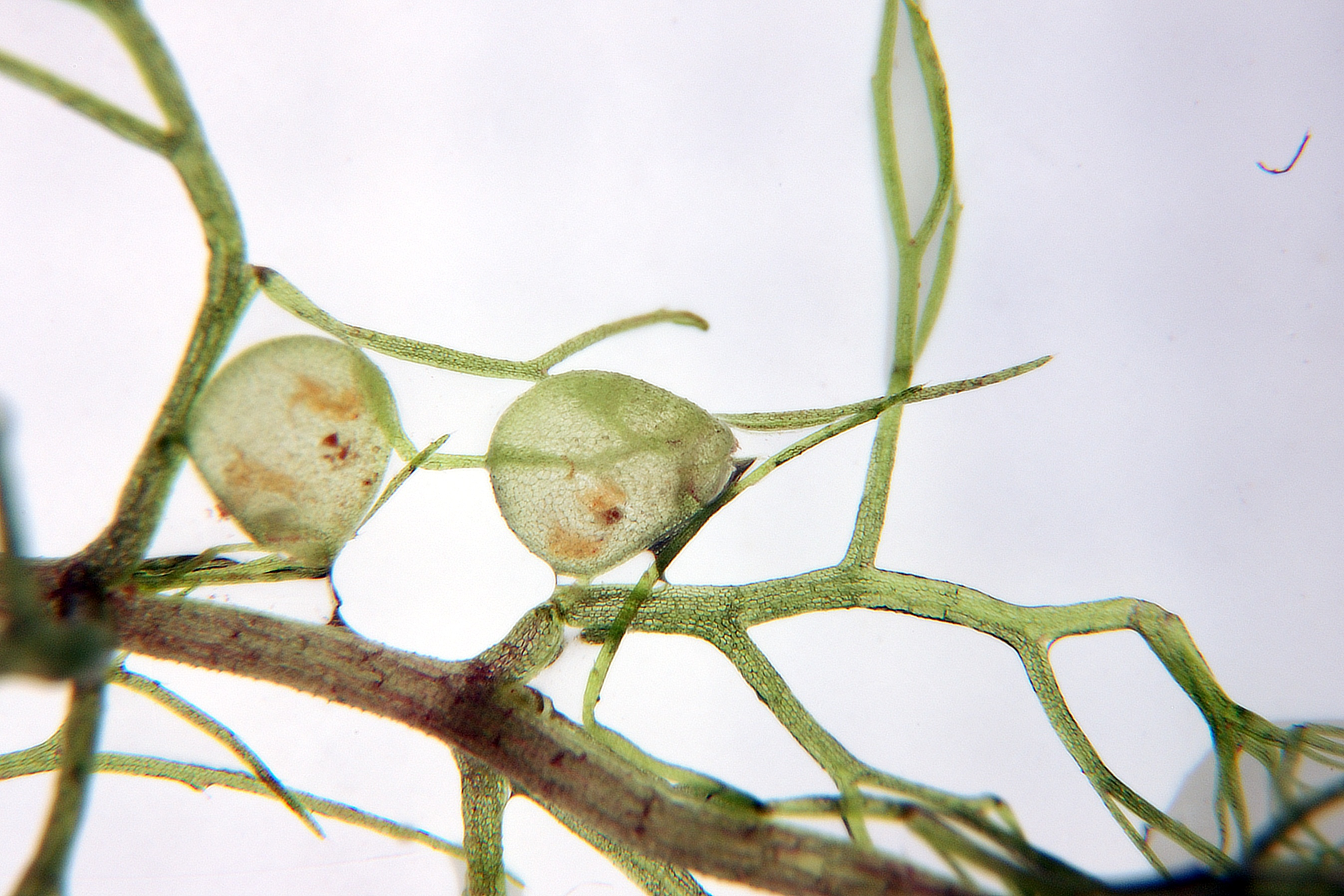
Traps of Utricularia aurea

Darwin’s teacher and mentor at Cambridge, John Stevens Henslow, had a clear understanding of the morphology of Utricularia (bladderwort) plants, but was not able to understand working mechanics of their traps. Darwin incorrectly concluded that animals entered the traps by forcing their heads through the slit-like orifice with their heads serving as a wedge. In a letter to Treat he informed her that this subject drove him ‘half-mad’. Treat became deeply absorbed in this problem, researching intensively. Through long hours of observing the trapping sequence under her microscope she realised that the hairs around the entrance to the trap were sensitive and part of the process by which Utricularia traps opened, contributing new knowledge on the range of microscopic animal prey caught in these traps and the digestive processes they were subjected to. Treat described it as ‘these little bladders... in truth like so many stomachs, digesting and assimilating animal food’. Darwin was so impressed with Treat’s work on carnivorous plants that he referenced her, both within the main text and in footnotes, throughout his publication Insectivorous Plants (1875).

By making such public affirmations of Treat’s scientific work, in Tina Gianquitto’s opinion Darwin legitimized her role as a scientist, though this is not completely uncontested among historians. With the advent of the Internet, Treat's correspondence with Darwin has been analyzed in more detail.

== Legacy ==
The best archive of Treat's life is available at the Vineland Historical and Antiquarian Society.

The Harvard University herbarium has a selection of Treat's specimens sent to Asa Gray and examples of their original correspondence. The original letters are, in the main, available to view through The Darwin Correspondence Project and at Cambridge University Library.

The ant species Aphaenogaster mariae is named after Treat; it was first described in 1886, following her collecting specimens in Florida and sending them to Auguste Forel. Likewise, the ant species Aphaenogaster treatae was named after Treat by Forel in honor of her discovery of ant specimens in Florida and New Jersey, and Austrian entomologist Gustav Mayr named an oak fig root gall wasp (cynipid) species Belonocnema treatae in honor of Treat after she discovered it on a Virginia oak tree in Florida. She also discovered the amaryllis species Zephyranthes treatae, which Sereno Watson named after her. She is also the discoverer and namesake of the ant species Dolichoderus mariae.

Mary Treat was fictionalized as a major supporting character in the 2018 historical novel Unsheltered, by the American writer Barbara Kingsolver, who took liberties in her portrayal of Treat and 19th-century Vineland, New Jersey.

Poet Jessy Randall's 2022 collection Mathematics for Ladies includes a poem honoring Treat.

== Works ==
Many of Treat's works detailed her observations of insects and birds in a style accessible to a popular audience.

- Chapters on Ants (1879)
- Injurious Insects of the Farm and Garden (1882)
- Home Studies in Nature (1885)
- Through a Microscope (1886)
- My Garden Pets (1887)
- Asa Gray: His Life and Work (1890)

== See also ==
- Timeline of women in science
