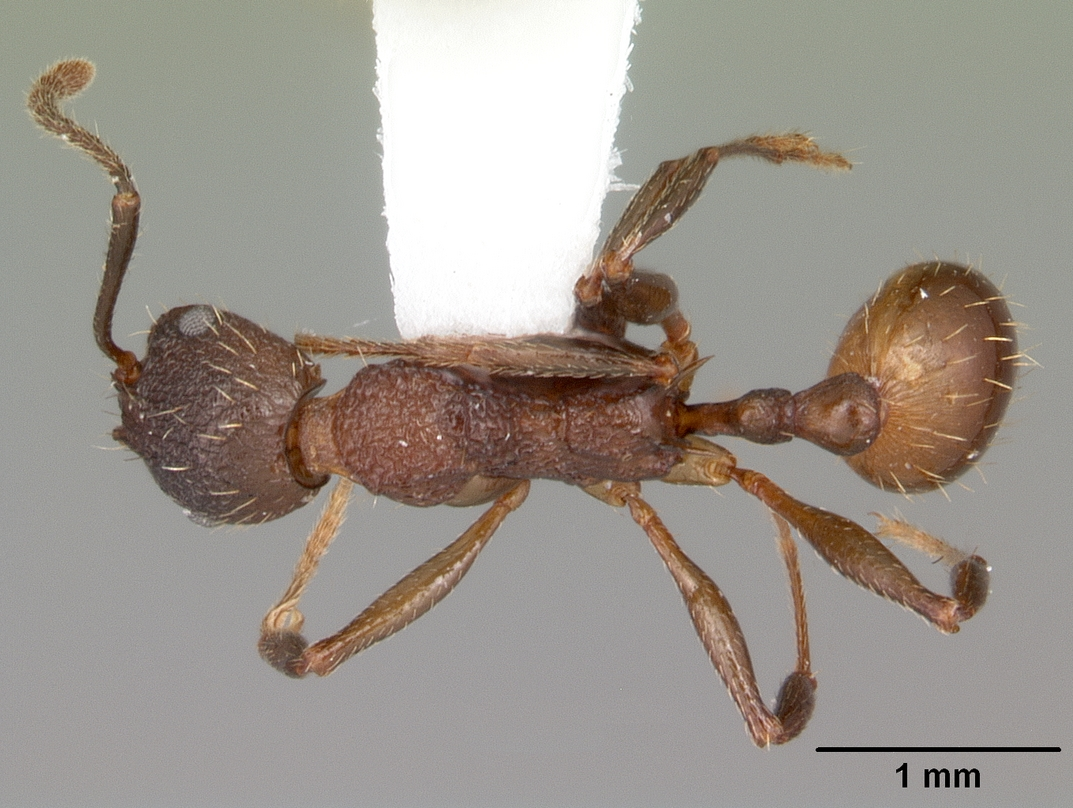

Scientific classification
- Kingdom: Animalia
- Phylum: Arthropoda
- Class: Insecta
- Order: Hymenoptera
- Family: Formicidae
- Subfamily: Myrmicinae
- Genus: Aphaenogaster
- Species: A. mariae

Binomial name
- Aphaenogaster mariae Forel, 1886

= Aphaenogaster mariae =

Species of ant

Aphaenogaster mariae is a species of ant in the family Formicidae. It nests in dead branches or beneath live bark of oak trees. Male specimens of this species were only discovered in 2021, which is the first time a colony of the species was collected. The colony was found in Wake County, North Carolina by North Carolina State University Ph.D student Michelle Kirchner. The species is only found in the eastern United States.

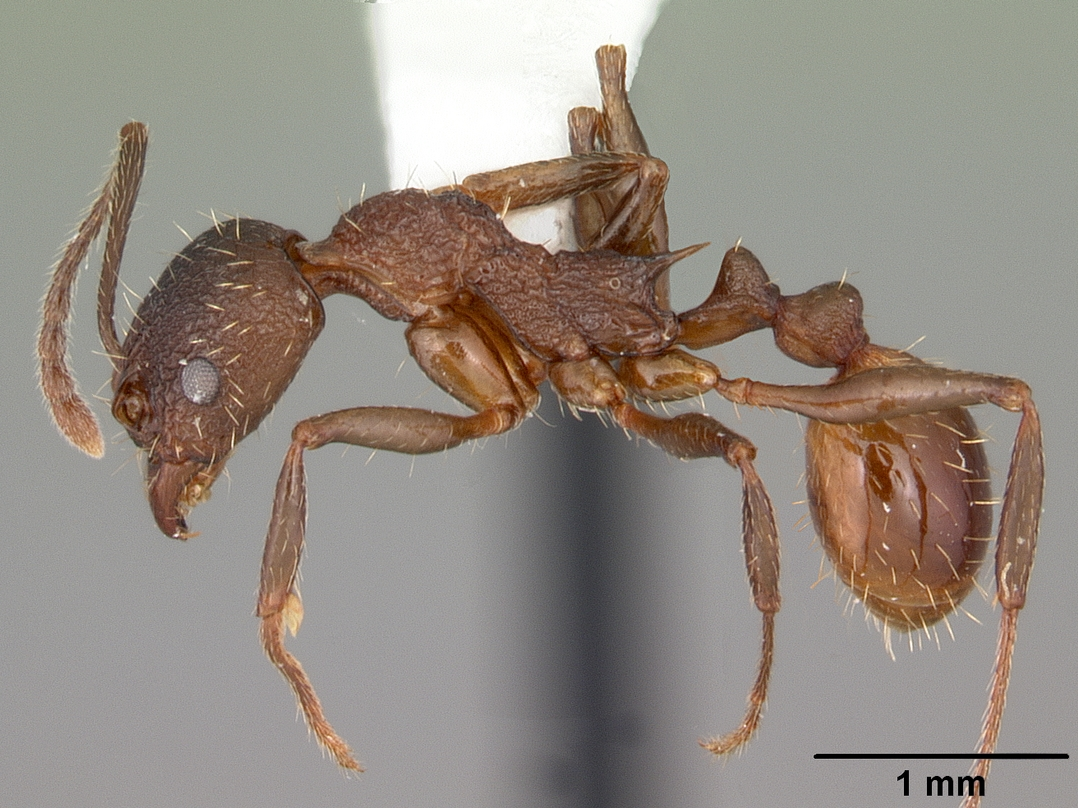

The species is named after Mary Treat; it was first described in 1886, following her collecting specimens in Florida and sending them to Auguste Forel.
