= Formicoxenus sibiricus =

Conservation status
- Vulnerable (IUCN 2.3)

Scientific classification
- Kingdom: Animalia
- Phylum: Arthropoda
- Class: Insecta
- Order: Hymenoptera
- Family: Formicidae
- Subfamily: Myrmicinae
- Genus: Formicoxenus
- Species: F. sibiricus

Binomial name
- Formicoxenus sibiricus (Forel, 1899)

Species of ant

Formicoxenus sibiricus is a species of ant in the genus Formicoxenus. It is endemic to Russia.
