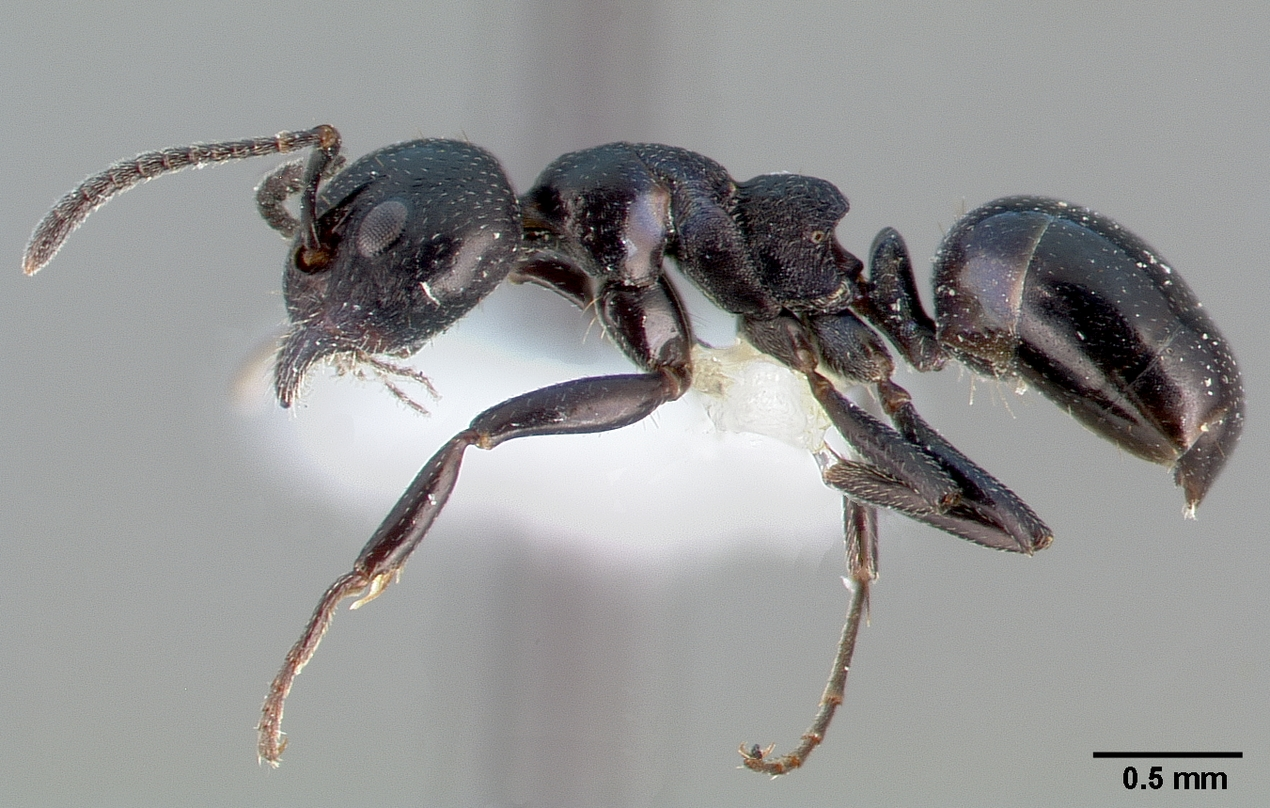

Scientific classification
- Kingdom: Animalia
- Phylum: Arthropoda
- Clade: Pancrustacea
- Class: Insecta
- Order: Hymenoptera
- Family: Formicidae
- Subfamily: Dolichoderinae
- Genus: Dolichoderus
- Species: D. taschenbergi

Binomial name
- Dolichoderus taschenbergi (Mayr, 1866)

Synonyms
- Dolichoderus taschenbergi aterrimus Wheeler, W.M., 1915; Dolichoderus taschenbergi gagates Wheeler, W.M., 1905; Dolichoderus taschenbergi wheeleriella Forel, 1916

= Dolichoderus taschenbergi =

Species of ant

Dolichoderus taschenbergi is a species of ant in the genus Dolichoderus. Described by Mayr in 1866, the species is endemic to Canada and the United States.

Dolichoderus taschenbergi is described as having a sporadic dispersion

== Behaviors ==
Dolichoderus Taschenbergi may have some polygynous nesting patterns although a lack of in depth research on this means it is still difficult to understand how colonies of this species form.
