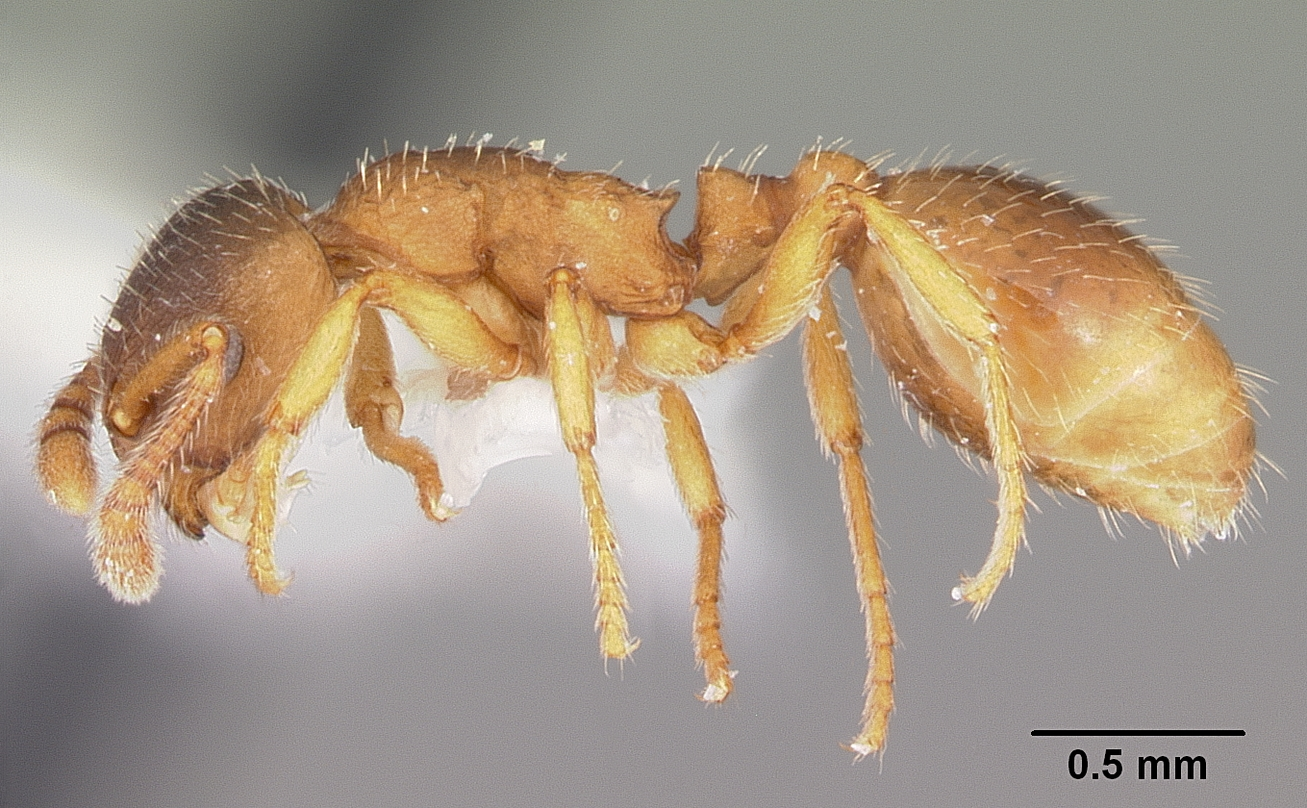
- Formicoxenus quebecensis worker

Conservation status
- Vulnerable (IUCN 2.3)

Scientific classification
- Kingdom: Animalia
- Phylum: Arthropoda
- Class: Insecta
- Order: Hymenoptera
- Family: Formicidae
- Subfamily: Myrmicinae
- Genus: Formicoxenus
- Species: F. quebecensis

Binomial name
- Formicoxenus quebecensis Francoeur, in Francoeur, Loiselle & Buschinger, 1985

= Formicoxenus quebecensis =

Species of ant

Formicoxenus quebecensis is a species of ant in the genus Formicoxenus. It is endemic to Canada.
