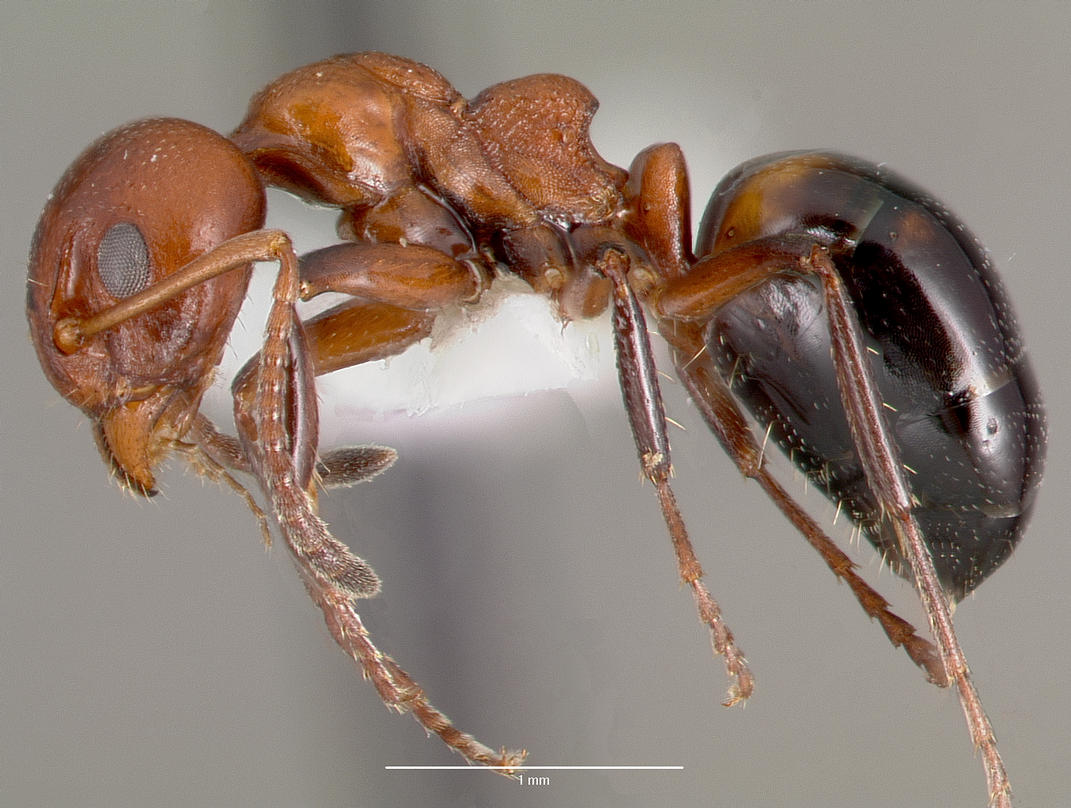
- Dolichoderus mariae worker

Scientific classification
- Domain: Eukaryota
- Kingdom: Animalia
- Phylum: Arthropoda
- Class: Insecta
- Order: Hymenoptera
- Family: Formicidae
- Subfamily: Dolichoderinae
- Genus: Dolichoderus
- Species: D. mariae

Binomial name
- Dolichoderus mariae Forel, 1885

= Dolichoderus mariae =

Species of ant

Dolichoderus mariae is a species of ant in the subfamily Dolichoderinae and is found in North America.

== Description ==
This ant is distinctively coloured with the head, antennae, thorax, legs and petiole and the anterior part of the first abdominal segment reddish or ochre-brown. The remainder of the abdomen is black or deep brown. The integument is smooth and reflective, though fine sculpturing granules can be seen under magnification. The propodeum is longer than it is wide. Posteriorly, the propodeum is concave with some fine vertical striations. The head and body are hairless.

== Distribution ==
This ant has a wide range which includes Illinois, Minnesota and Oklahoma, North and South Carolina, Georgia, Mississippi, Louisiana and northern Florida. The type locality is Vineland, New Jersey. It is common in some areas such as North and South Carolina, but rare in others and in the southern part of its range it can be confused with the similar species, Dolichoderus pustulatus.

== Naming ==
This species was discovered by Mary Treat, and is named for her.

== Ecology ==
This ant is found in prairies, glades and fens. It nests underground among plant roots.

A study of this species was undertaken in northern Florida. It was found that the worker ants remove soil from under clumps of wiregrass, other grasses or other fibrous rooted plants such as blackberry (Rubus spp.) or cattails (Typha spp.). The nest is a single, large conical chamber, which is open to the air round the base of the plant. Colonies make a number of these nests which are linked by trails across the ground along which ants move from one to another. There are many queens per nest. Over the winter there are just one or two nests in a colony but as summer advances, more and more chambers are excavated and there may be as many as sixty nests by late summer. After this the number starts to contract again. The colonies occupy roughly the same area each summer and territorial aggression has been noted between adjoining colonies. Within their territory, the ants tend and milk aphids and scale insects for their honeydew and also scavenge for dead insects. The size of the colony and the number of nests seemed to depend on the number of hemipterans in the territorial area. When these are abundant during the winter, the colony does not contract to such a great extent as when the season is harsh.

Observations inside nests showed that the workers, queen, alates and brood took up stations on the fibrous roots which formed a sort of scaffolding in their nests. The size of the nest varied with the size of the root system of the plant above. During the summer, above some of the nests, workers chewed bits of plant material to produce a papery felt or thatch. However, it was not clear why this was done for some nests and not others. During the winter, the average nest housed about 75,000 workers and 12 to 59 queens. In the summer, the number of workers ranged from 13,000 to 19,000 while there were about 180 queens per nest. Alates first appeared in April but the majority were found in July. Nuptial flights took place early in the morning after heavy rains with thousands of male alates taking to the wing in search of other nests or colonies. The female alates mostly remained at their nests of origin where they presumably mated and joined the other queens already present.

During the winter, the abandoned nests provide shelter for vertebrates and invertebrates such as snakes, lizards and ground dwelling spiders.
