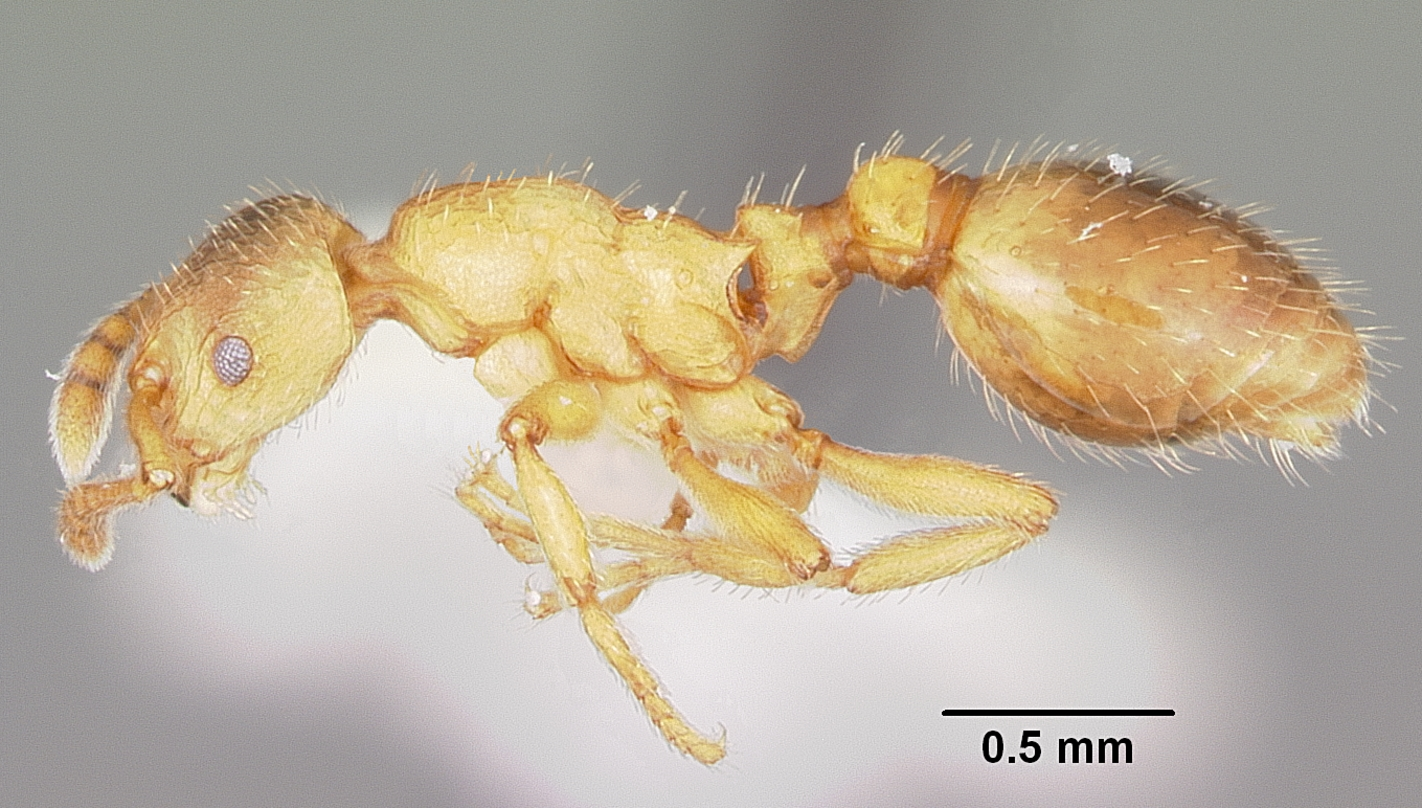

Conservation status
- Vulnerable (IUCN 2.3)

Scientific classification
- Kingdom: Animalia
- Phylum: Arthropoda
- Class: Insecta
- Order: Hymenoptera
- Family: Formicidae
- Subfamily: Myrmicinae
- Genus: Formicoxenus
- Species: F. provancheri

Binomial name
- Formicoxenus provancheri (Emery, 1895)

= Formicoxenus provancheri =

Species of ant

Formicoxenus provancheri, common name shampoo ant, is a species of ant in the subfamily Myrmicinae. It is found in Canada and the United States.
