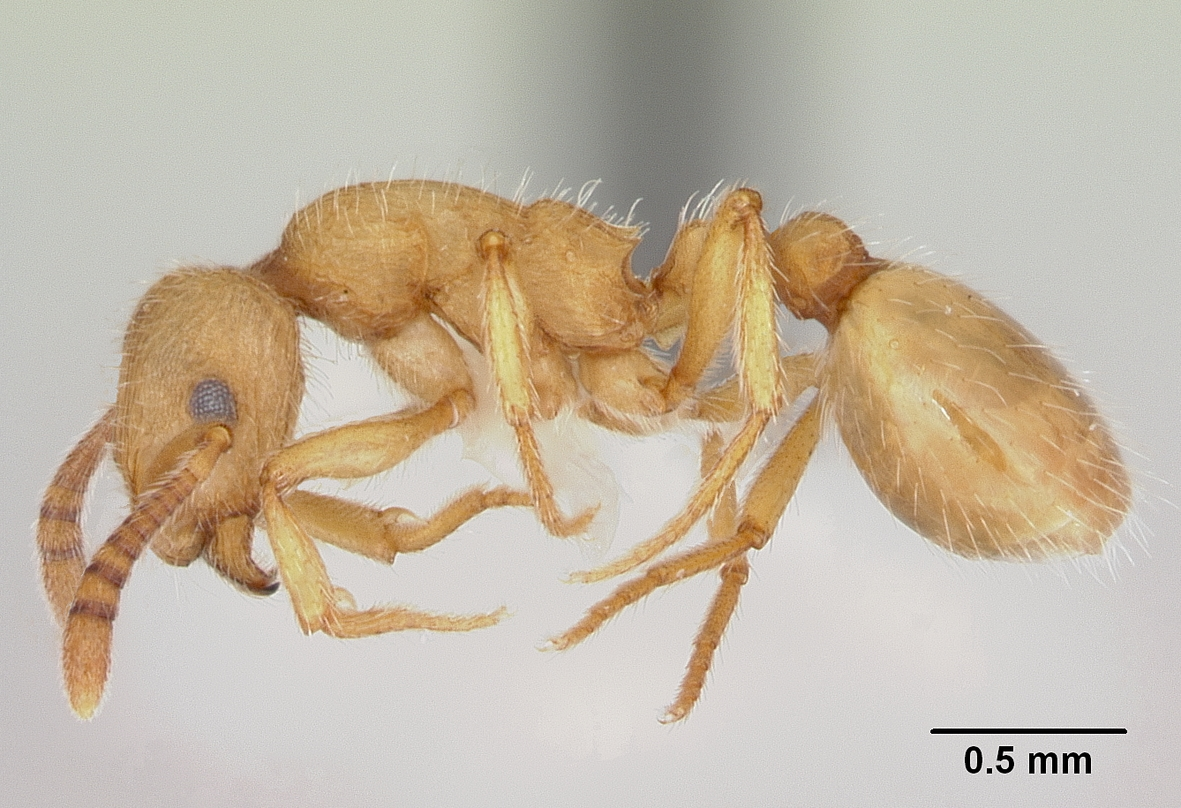
- Formicoxenus chamberlini worker

Conservation status
- Vulnerable (IUCN 2.3)

Scientific classification
- Kingdom: Animalia
- Phylum: Arthropoda
- Class: Insecta
- Order: Hymenoptera
- Family: Formicidae
- Subfamily: Myrmicinae
- Genus: Formicoxenus
- Species: F. chamberlini

Binomial name
- Formicoxenus chamberlini (Wheeler, 1904)

Synonyms
- Symmyrmica chamberlini

= Formicoxenus chamberlini =

Species of ant

Formicoxenus chamberlini is a species of ant in the subfamily Myrmicinae. It is endemic to the United States.
