= Barnard D. Burks =

American entomologist

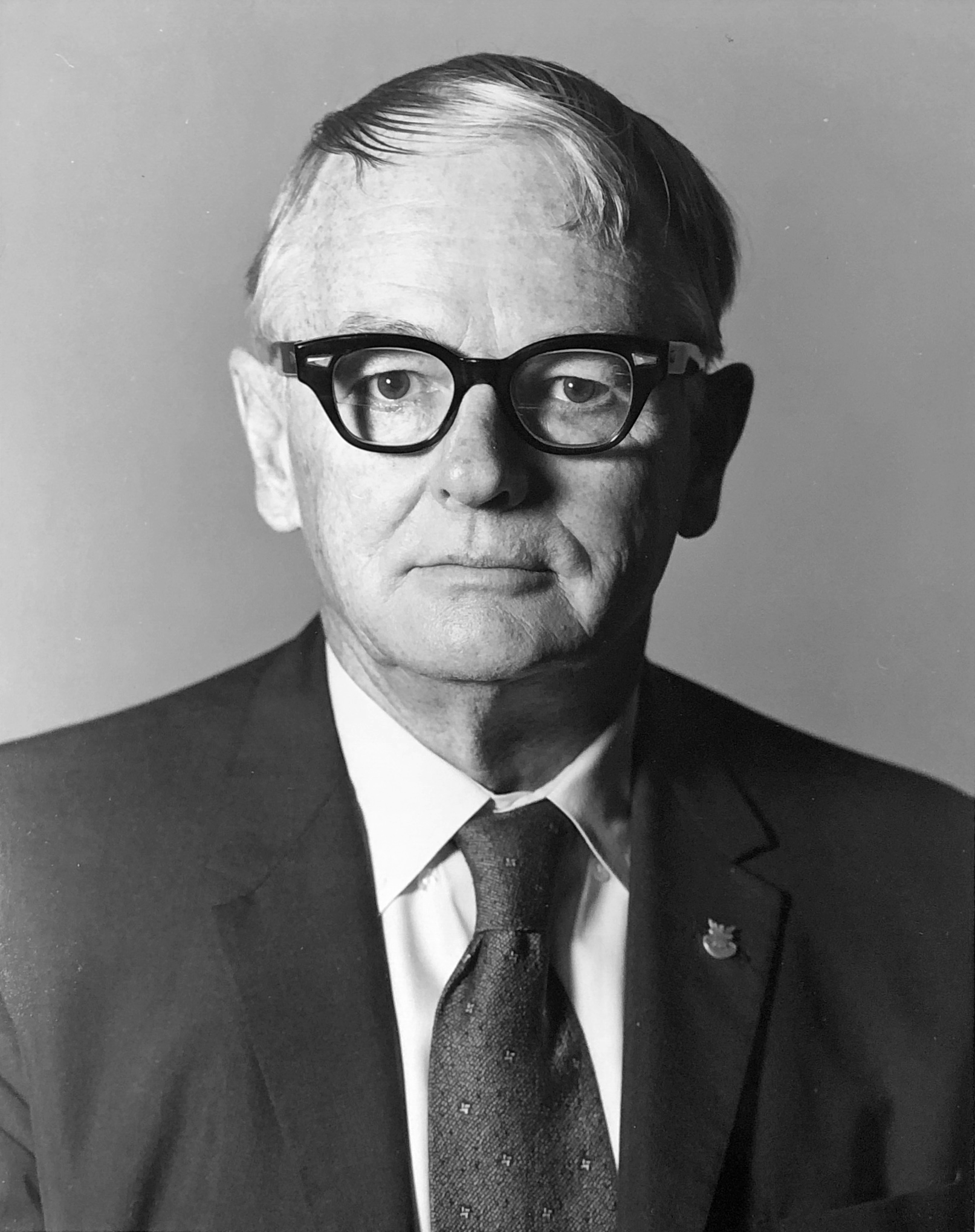
Portrait of Barnard D. Burks, INHS Entomologist, 1935–1949.

Barnard DeWitt Burks (1909–1990) was an American entomologist.

== Biography ==
Burks was born in 1909. He studied at the University of Illinois at Urbana–Champaign from which he received his bachelor's degree in 1933. Next year, he got his master's degree, and in 1937 his Ph.D. in entomology from the same place. Starting from 1935 to 1942 he had an assistant entomologist position at the State Natural History Survey in Urbana, Illinois.

From 1942 to 1946 he served in the United States Army Sanitary Corps, where he became a major. In 1946 he came back to the State Natural History Survey, which gave him a position as associate taxonomist, he resigned a few years later though due to the fact that he got a job as entomologist at the Division of Insect Identification a division of the United States Department of Agriculture. Due to his efforts, the division became the Systematic Entomology Laboratory, after 1972. From 1964 he kept a title of collaborative scientist and continued to study parasitic Hymenoptera, a job which he kept till his retirement 10 years later. From 1954 to 1967 he had a position of associate editor of American Midland Naturalist, in which he reviewed his entomology papers for his own journal. He died in 1990.
