= Leaf flushing =

Production of a flush of new leaves on a tree

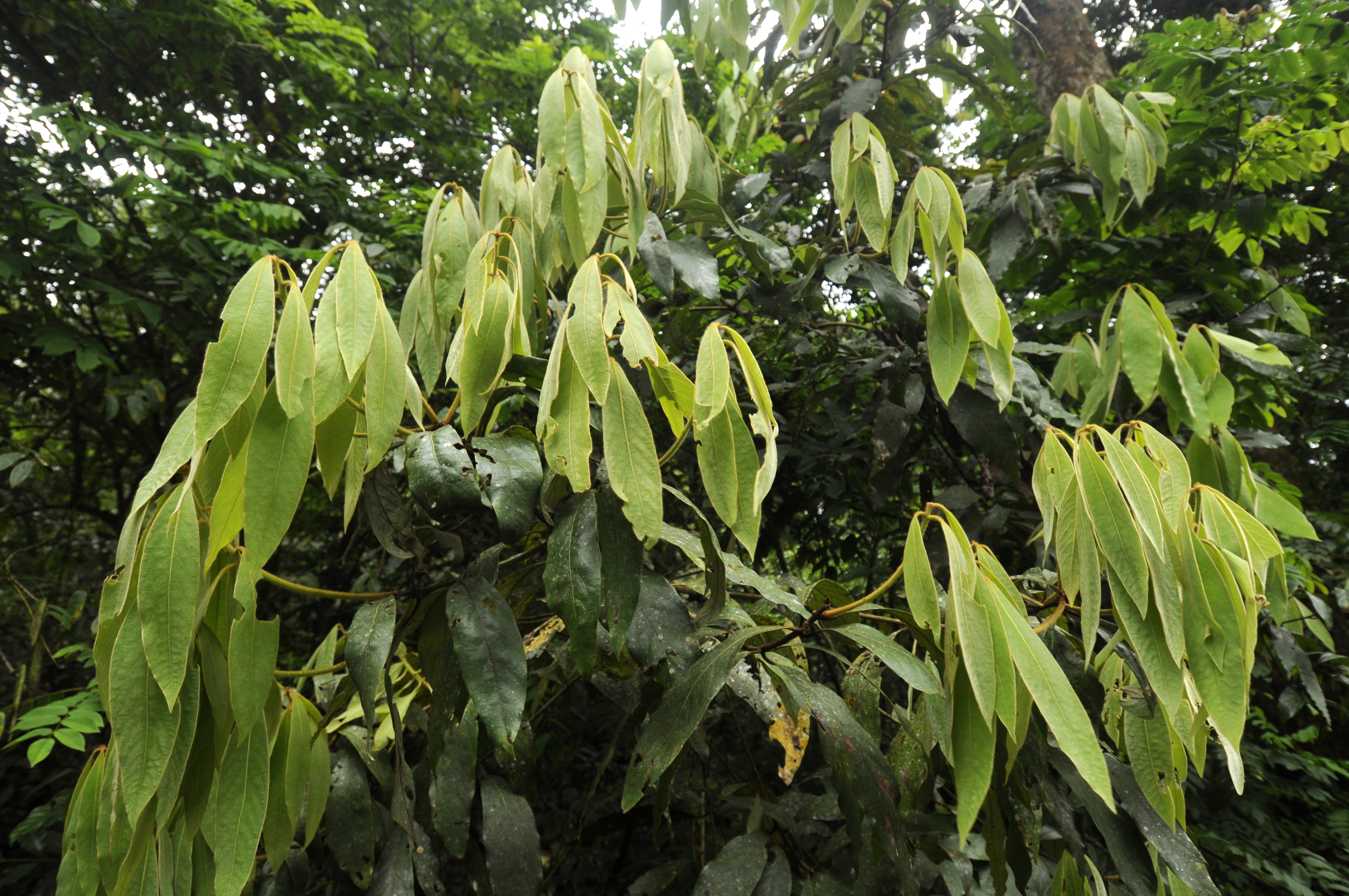
Leaf flush in an Actinodaphne tree showing young whitish leaves turning pale green against the darker green mature leaves.

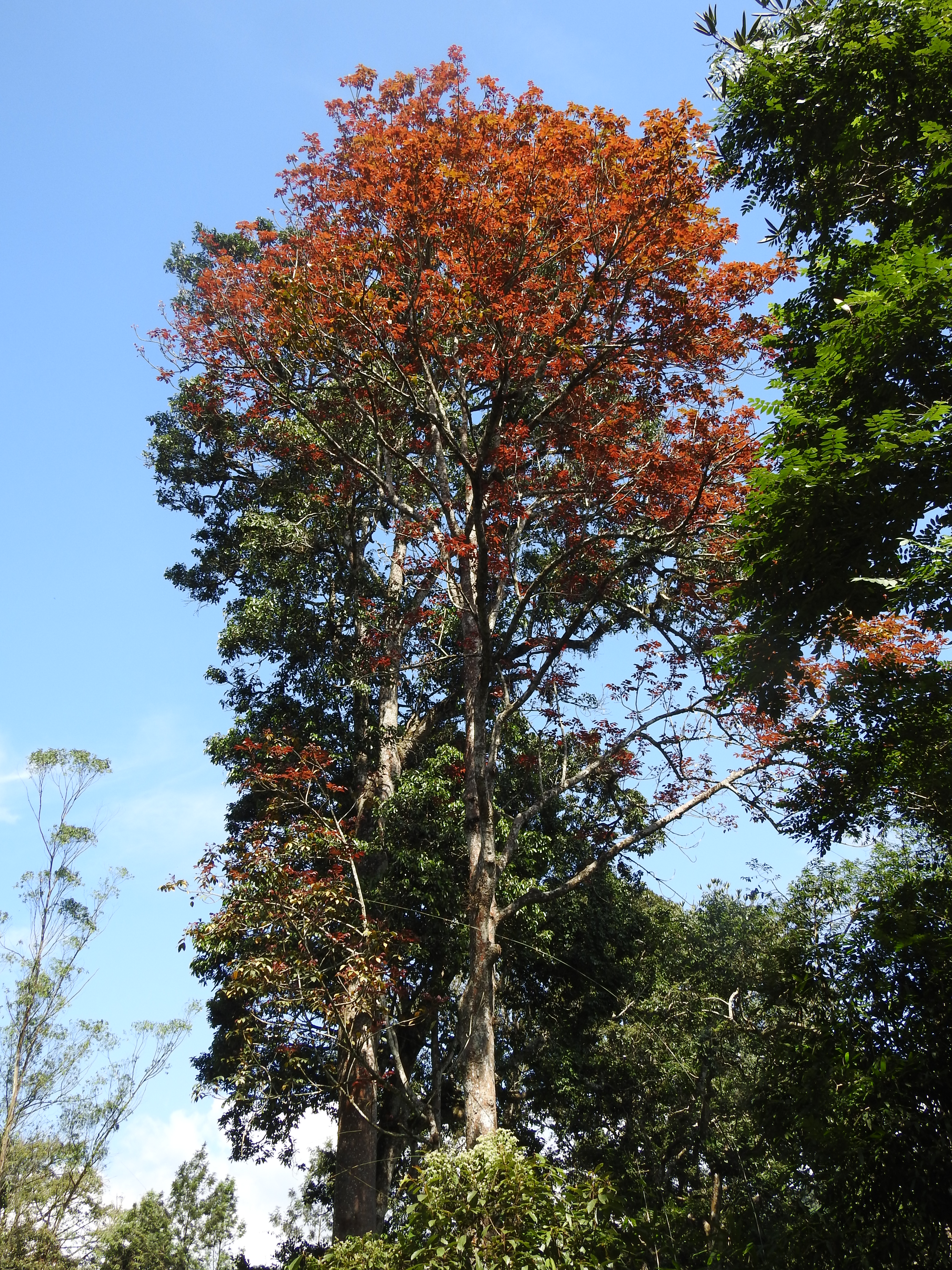
A Canarium strictum tree in red leaf flush.

Leaf flushing or leaf out is the production of a flush of new leaves typically produced simultaneously on all branches of a bare plant or tree. Young leaves often have less chlorophyll and the leaf flush may be white or red, the latter due to presence of pigments, particularly anthocyanins. Leaf flushing succeeds leaf fall, and is delayed by winter in the temperate zone or by extreme dryness in the tropics. Leaf fall and leaf flushing in tropical deciduous forests can overlap in some species, called leaf-exchanging species, producing new leaves during the same period when old leaves are shed or almost immediately after. Leaf-flushing may be synchronized among trees of a single species or even across species in an area. In the seasonal tropics, leaf flushing phenology may be influenced by herbivory and water stress.

== Red leaf flush ==
In tropical regions, leaves often flush red when young and in the phase of expansion to mature size. Red flushing is frequent among woody species, reported from 20 to 40% of the woody species in a site in Costa Rica, in 36% of species in Barro Colorado Island, Panama, about 49% of species in Kibale National Park, Uganda, and in 83 of 250 species in Southern Yunnan, China. The red coloration is primarily due to the presence of anthocyanins. Various hypotheses have been advanced to explain red flushing. The herbivore defense hypothesis suggests that the red coloration may make the leaves less likely to be attacked by insects as they are cryptic to herbivores that are blind to the red part of the spectrum. It has also been hypothesised that the anthocyanins may reduce light stress or fungal attacks on leaves. A recent study in tropical forest region of China provides support for the herbivore defense hypothesis, indicating that the red coloration of young leaves protects them from attacks by herbivorous insects through chemical defense as the red leaves have high concentrations of tannins and anthocyanins.
