= Gustav Mayr =

Austrian entomologist (1830–1908)

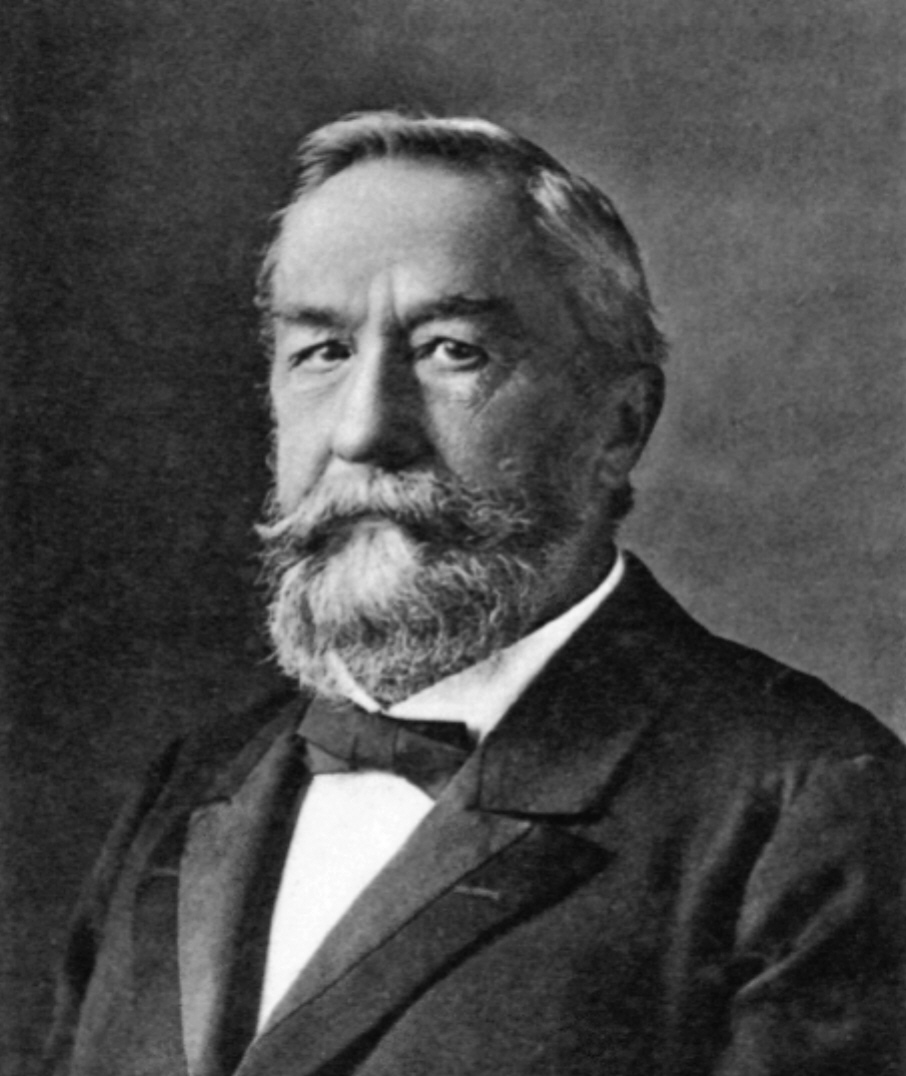
Gustav Mayr

Gustav L. Mayr (12 October 1830 – 14 July 1908) was an Austrian entomologist and professor in Budapest and Vienna. He specialised in Hymenoptera, being particularly known for his studies of ants.

In 1868, he was the first to describe the Argentine ant. He is credited with naming the harvesting ant species, Aphaenogaster treatae, for naturalist Mary Davis Treat, in honor of her research on the species.

== Life and career ==
Mayr was born into the family of a lawyer, Ignaz Mayr, and his wife, née Rosalie Holzer, in Vienna. After completing classical high school and studying at the faculty of philosophy, Mayr began studying medicine in Vienna. From 1851, he was a member of the Vienna Botanical and Zoological Society (Zoologisch-Botanische Gesellschaft). He was a doctor of medicine in 1856, then taught natural sciences and chemistry in secondary schools in Pest, but he lost his post in 1861, because of the Magyarization laws which prohibited teaching in German in Hungarian secondary schools. He moved to Vienna, where he taught natural history in an Oberrealschule, until his retirement in 1892. The honorary title of imperial advisor (kaiserlicher Rat) was then awarded to him, after having received the golden cross of merit in 1876.

Mayr was passionate about entomology and in particular about the Hymenoptera, and specialised in the systematics of ants. He donated one of his collections of hymenopterans, bringing together 1,350 species represented by around 5,500 specimens, to the Natural History Museum, Vienna, in 1896. Another collection of 2,180 species of ants, and other collections of insects was bequeathed by him in his will to the Vienna Botanical and Zoological Society, but they later sold it to the museum, not having the facilities to maintain it.

Between 1862 and 1901, he described 58 genera of ants (including Acromyrmex, Anochetus, Aphaenogaster, Camponotus, Formicoxenus, Leptothorax, Monomorium, and Tetramorium) and over 500 new species of ants. He also described unique collections of fossil ants preserved in Baltic amber (1868), ants from Tibet brought back by the expeditions of Nikolay Przhevalsky, and ants from Turkestan collected by explorer Alexei Fedchenko. He was responsible for writing the zoological part concerning ants in the travel report of the Austrian Imperial Novara expedition that circumnavigated the world between 1857 and 1859.

He died in Vienna.

== Works ==
Mayr's works include:

- Formicidae [der Novara-Expedition] (Ants of the Novara Expedition). Vienna 1865.
- Die Ameisen des baltischen Bernsteins (The Ants of Baltic Amber). Königsberg: Koch, 1868.
- Feigeninsecten (Fig Insects). Vienna: Hölder, 1885.
- Hymenopterologische Miscellen (Hymenopteran Miscellanea). Vienna: Hölder, 1902.
- Formiciden aus Ägypten und dem Sudan (Ants from Egypt and Sudan). (1903).
