= Mermithergate =

Mermithergate (a and b) and normal workers of Camponotus punctulatus

Soldier, worker and mermithergate of Pheidole dentata

A mermithergate is an ant worker that has a changed appearance as a result of an Enoplia nematode infection.

== Etymology ==
The word was coined by William M. Wheeler in 1910. It is a combination of the nematode genus Mermis, for which Wheeler first described the phenomenon, and ergate, which means ant worker. Infected females (queens) are called mermithogynes.

== Infection cycle ==
Up to 5% of some populations of Cephalotes atratus suffer from an infection by the tetradonematid nematode Myrmeconema neotropicum. It causes the ant's abdomen to turn from black to bright red, strikingly resembling a red berry. In addition, the ant then holds it up most of the time, and it is easily ripped off. Birds easily mistake these for real fruit and pick them, while they avoid eating normal ants. The nematodes pass through the bird's digestive system as eggs without harming it. The circle closes when C. atratus workers feed on the bird droppings, thus getting infected.

== See also ==
- Gamergate (type of ant)
- Honeypot ant
