= Glossary of ant terms =

This is a glossary of terms used in the descriptions of ants.

== A ==
alate
winged reproductive male or female ant

== B ==
Berlese funnel

device used to extract ants and other living organism from soil and leaf-litter samples; a sample is placed on a screen with a funnel beneath, and a heat source above; the drying forces the animals downwards, where they fall into a collecting jar, usually filled with alcohol
bivouac
in army and driver ants, nest formed by the bodies of the ants themselves to protect the queen and larvae

== D ==
dulosis
see slave-making
dichthadiiform
wingless queen with enlarged gaster, having a broadened head, very small eyes and worker-like alitrunk
domatium

in plants, tiny chamber produced by plants to house arthropods

== E ==
epigaeic

living or foraging above the ground
ergate
a member of the non-reproductive, laboring caste.
ergatogyne

denotes any intercaste female morphologically intermediate between workers and (winged) queens, not restricted to the reproductive caste; formerly often used interchangeably to refer to ergatoid queens
ergatoid

a wingless (dealate) reproductive adult ant, anatomically intermediate in form between workers and winged queens or males

== F ==
fungivorous
feeding on fungi

== G ==
gamergate
a mated, egg-laying, female worker in species lacking a queen
granivorous
seed herbivory, feeding on grain
gyne
a member of the female reproductive caste

== H ==
haplometrosis

colony founding by a single queen
hypogaeic

subterranean, living below the ground, or at least beneath the leaf litter, stones or dead bark

== M ==
mermithergate

"parasitogenic" phenotype of worker ants, caused by mermithid nematodes
mermithogyne

"parasitogenic" phenotype of gynes, caused by mermithid nematodes
monandry

queen mating with a single male
monodomy

colony housing arrangement in a single nest
monogyny

nest arrangement containing a single queen
multicoloniality

nest arrangement of a population of ants consisting of multiple independent colonies (monodomous or polydomous)
myrmecochory
seed dispersal by ants
myrmecodomatium

domatium housed by ants
myrmecologist
a student of ants
myrmecology
the study of ants
myrmecophily
association of various organisms with ants
myrmecophyte
plant that lives in a mutualistic association with ants

== N ==
nanitic
a worker of the first generation, usually smaller in size than subsequent generations

== O ==
oligogyny
nest arrangement with multiple queens, defined by worker tolerance towards all queens in the colony and antagonism among the queens

== P ==
pheromone trail

trail of chemical compounds secreted by ants to guide nestmates to a target (usually food)
pilosity
quality of being covered with hair
pleometrosis

colony founding by multiple queens
plerergate
see replete
polyandry

queen mating with multiple males
polydomy

colony arrangement housed in multiple separate nests
polyethism
division of labor, the development of different roles
polygyny

nest arrangement containing multiple queens
polymorphism
in social insects, having more than one caste within the same sex
primary monogyny

single queen founding a colony (haplometrosis), with no additional queens incorporated into the colony
primary polygyny

colony founding by multiple queens (pleometrosis), with more than one queen surviving

== Q ==
queen
see gyne

== R ==
replete
worker ant that functions as a living larder, having an enlarged abdomen filled with liquid food
secondary monogyny

colony founding by multiple queens (pleometrosis), a single queen survive

== S ==
secondary polygyny

colony founding by a single queen (haplometrosis), with additional queens incorporated into the colony at a later stage, usually by adoption or fusion with other colonies
slave-making
the capture of brood of other ant species that is then reared as slaves

== T ==
tandem running

recruitment method used by some species of ants, where one ant leads a single, closely following nestmate to a target (usually food)
trail pheromone
see pheromone trail
trophallaxis
transfer of liquid food among family members or guest organisms
trophic egg
non-viable egg laid by the queen to be used as a source of nutrition
trophobiosis
mutualistic relationships between ants and other insects

== U ==
unicoloniality

a population of ants inhabiting a single large polydomous colony

== W ==
Winkler extraction

device used to extract ants and other living organism from soil and leaf-litter samples; a sample is placed inside an inner bag constructed from cloth mesh, which is suspended in a second bag containing a funnel leading to a collecting jar, usually filled with alcohol; the device is hung up in the air and passively extracts escaping animals

== See also ==
- Glossary of entomology terms
- Glossary of scientific names
- Glossary of scientific naming
