= Aranimermis giganteus =

Scientific classification
- Domain: Eukaryota
- Kingdom: Animalia
- Phylum: Nematoda
- Class: Enoplea
- Order: Mermithida
- Family: Mermithidae
- Genus: Aranimermis
- Species: A. giganteus

Binomial name
- Aranimermis giganteus Poinar & Early, 1990

Species of roundworm

Aranimermis giganteus is the largest known species of Mermithidae and often infects the mygalomorph spiders of New Zealand.

== Taxonomy ==
Aranimermis giganteus was described in 1990 from samples collected from parasitized spiders caught in traps.
