= Aquaemermis =

Scientific classification
- Domain: Eukaryota
- Kingdom: Animalia
- Phylum: Nematoda
- Class: Enoplea
- Order: Mermithida
- Family: Mermithidae
- Genus: Aquaemermis; Rubzov, 1973

Genus of roundworms

Aquaemermis is a genus of nematodes belonging to the family Mermithidae.

Species:

- Aquaemermis macrocarpus Rubzov, 1979
- Aquaemermis mirabilis Rubzov, 1973
