= Mesomermis =

Scientific classification
- Domain: Eukaryota
- Kingdom: Animalia
- Phylum: Nematoda
- Class: Enoplea
- Order: Mermithida
- Family: Mermithidae
- Genus: Mesomermis; Daday, 1911

Genus of roundworms

Mesomermis is a genus of nematodes belonging to the family Mermithidae.

Species:

- Mesomermis acutata Rubzov, 1973
- Mesomermis acuticauda Artyukhovskii & Kharchenko, 1971
