= Eurymermis =

Scientific classification
- Domain: Eukaryota
- Kingdom: Animalia
- Phylum: Nematoda
- Class: Enoplea
- Order: Mermithida
- Family: Mermithidae
- Genus: Eurymermis; Müller, 1931

Genus of roundworms

Eurymermis is a genus of nematodes belonging to the family Mermithidae.

The genus was first described by Müller in 1931.

Species:

- Eurymermis arkhanhelsis Rubtsov, 1981
- Eurymermis chrysopidis
- Eurymermis habermanii Rubtsov, 1973
- Eurymermis intermedia Rubtsov, 1973
- Eurymermis lacustris Rubtsov, 1973
- Eurymermis muticata Rubtsov, 1980
- Eurymermis stratiomyi Bekturganov, Gubaidulin & Dubitskij, 1991
- Eurymermis tchaunensis Vosylyte, 1982
- Eurymermis ventricosa Rubtsov, 1973
