= Paramermis =

Scientific classification
- Domain: Eukaryota
- Kingdom: Animalia
- Phylum: Nematoda
- Class: Enoplea
- Order: Mermithida
- Family: Mermithidae
- Genus: Paramermis; Linstow, 1898

Genus of roundworms

Paramermis is a genus of nematodes belonging to the family Mermithidae.

Species:

- Paramermis anteriostoma Rubzov, 1977
- Paramermis antica Rubzov, 1976
