= Octomyomermis =

Scientific classification
- Domain: Eukaryota
- Kingdom: Animalia
- Phylum: Nematoda
- Class: Enoplea
- Order: Mermithida
- Family: Mermithidae
- Genus: Octomyomermis; Johnson, 1963

Genus of roundworms

Octomyomermis is a genus of nematodes belonging to the family Mermithidae.

Species:

- Octomyomermis albicans Camino, 1985
- Octomyomermis arecoensis Camino, 1991
