= Brevinema =

Brevinema may refer to:

- Brevinema (nematode), a genus of nematodes in the family Tetradonematidae
- Brevinema (bacterium), a genus of bacteria in the family Brevinemataceae
- Brevinema, a genus of nematodes in the family Longidoridae, synonym of Longidorus
