= Pseudomermis =

Scientific classification
- Domain: Eukaryota
- Kingdom: Animalia
- Phylum: Nematoda
- Class: Enoplea
- Order: Mermithida
- Family: Mermithidae
- Genus: Pseudomermis de Man, 1902

Genus of roundworms

Pseudomermis is a genus of nematodes belonging to the family Mermithidae.

Species:

- Pseudomermis aorista (Steiner, 1919)
- Pseudomermis filiformis Rubzov, 1982
