= Abathymermis parva =

Scientific classification
- Domain: Eukaryota
- Kingdom: Animalia
- Phylum: Nematoda
- Class: Enoplea
- Order: Mermithida
- Family: Mermithidae
- Genus: Abathymermis
- Species: A. parva

Binomial name
- Abathymermis parva Rubtsov, 1973

Species of roundworm

Abathymermis parva is a species of nematode belonging to the family Mermithidae.

It is a freshwater species.
