= Odonatomermis =

Scientific classification
- Domain: Eukaryota
- Kingdom: Animalia
- Phylum: Nematoda
- Class: Enoplea
- Order: Mermithida
- Family: Mermithidae
- Genus: Odonatomermis; Rubzov, 1973

Genus of roundworms

Odonatomermis is a genus of nematodes belonging to the family Mermithidae.

Species:

- Odonatomermis atlaensis Rubzov, 1973
- Odonatomermis badia Rubzov, 1973
- Odonatomermis polyclada Rubzov, 1973
