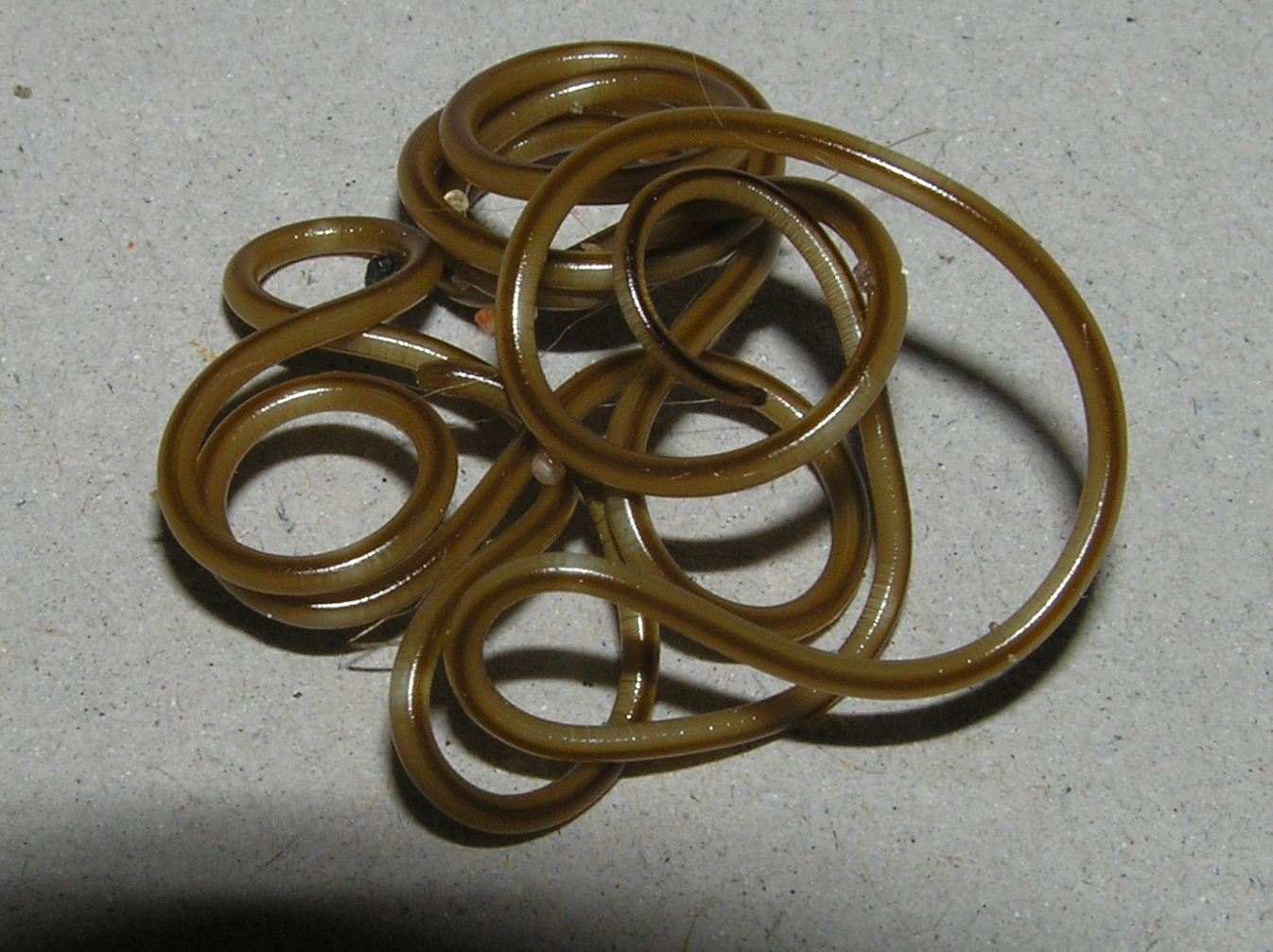

Scientific classification
- Kingdom: Animalia
- Phylum: Nematoda
- Class: Enoplea
- Order: Mermithida
- Family: Mermithidae
- Genus: Mermis
- Species: M. nigrescens

Binomial name
- Mermis nigrescens Dujardin, 1842

= Mermis nigrescens =

Species of roundworm

Mermis nigrescens is a species of nematode known commonly as the grasshopper nematode. It is distributed in the Americas, Europe, and Asia. It occurs in Tasmania, but it has not been observed on mainland Australia. It has been rarely observed in Africa. It is a parasite of insects, especially grasshoppers.

== Description ==
This is a very large nematode, the male about 4 to 6 centimetres long and the female known to exceed 20 centimetres. The size is unusual for entomopathogenic nematodes, which are generally almost microscopic. The body is pale brown, and the gravid female has a dark stripe down the length of its body due to the presence of up to 14,000 eggs. The body surface is smooth. It tapers at the front end, and the head and tail are rounded.

The adult female has a bright red or orange-red spot on its head. Early in studies of the nematode, this was called the "chromatrope", because it apparently had a function in the animal's response to light. On closer examination it had the form of a hollow cylinder, and the red pigment inside was determined to be hemoglobin. This haemoglobin, generally as oxyhaemoglobin, is densely concentrated in crystalline form. The cylinder was confirmed to be an ocellus, a form of eye. Haemoglobin takes the place of melanin as the shadowing pigment of the eye, and plays a role in the nematode's sensation of light, a function not observed in any other organism. Some other nematodes have eye structures, but that of the female M. nigrescens is unique. It has a single eye, where other nematodes have two. Only the female has an eye, where eyes are present in both sexes of other eyed nematodes. Its eye takes up the entire front end of the body, the cylinder filling the entire body cavity. It has a cornea, or a structure that acts as a cornea. All other eyed nematodes have melanin as the shadowing pigment. The unique eye of M. nigrescens probably evolved independently among nematode taxa.

This and other Mermis species are sometimes mistaken for horsehair worms, but the latter are longer and uniformly dark in colour, and their bodies do not taper.

== Life cycle ==
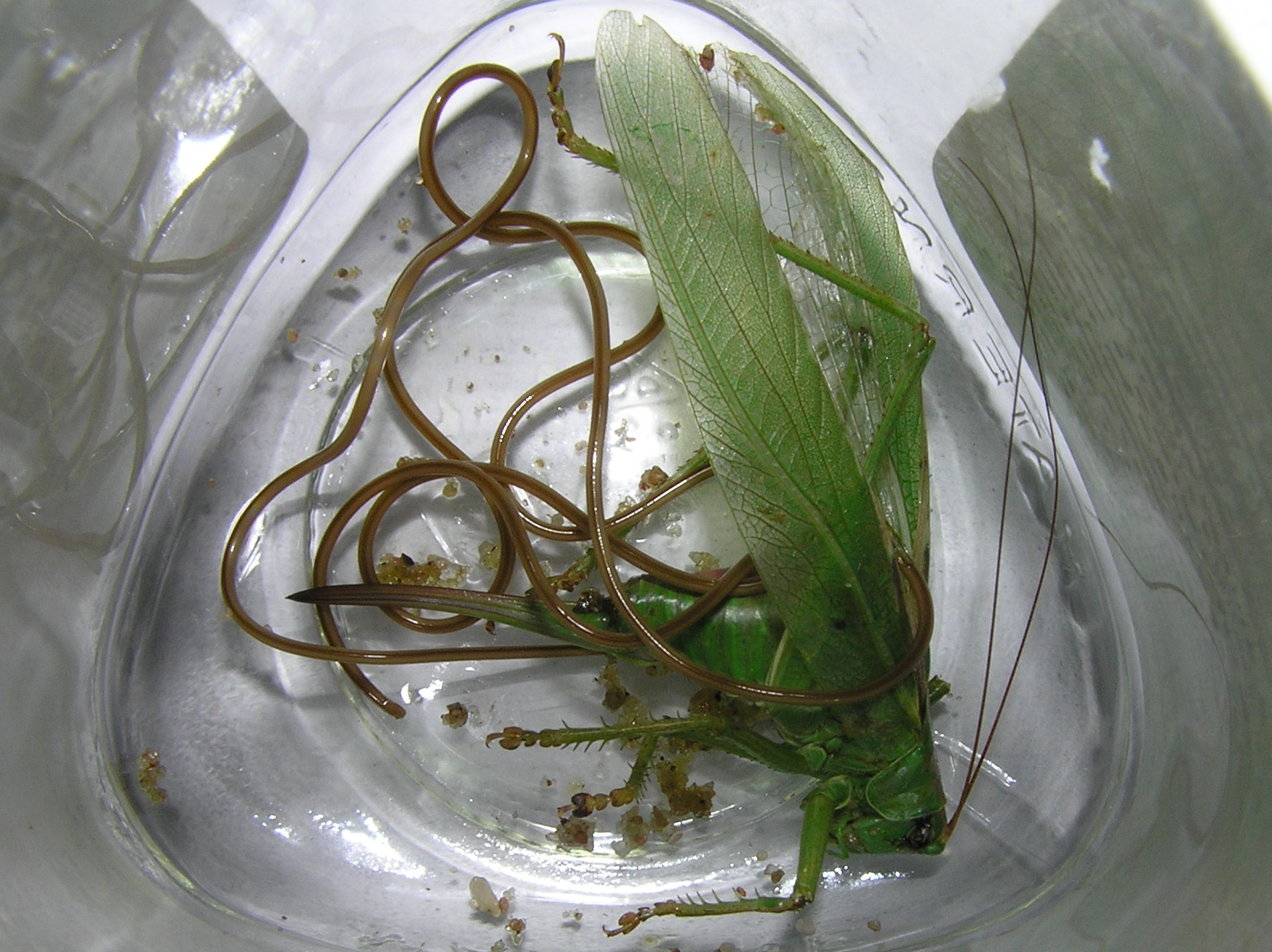
M. nigrescens emerging from a great green bush-cricket (Tettigonia viridissima)

The adult male and female nematode mate in spring or summer. The male then dies and the female remains in the soil through fall and winter. During the following spring or summer the female emerges after a rainfall event while the landscape is still wet, often early in the morning. It then climbs vegetation, sometimes reaching 2 or 3 meters above the ground. It lays its eggs on plants. The eggs are dark brown or reddish, and are about half a millimetre long. The eggs attach to the plant via filaments called byssi. They are consumed by herbivores along with the plant tissue.

This nematode is most often associated with grasshoppers. High levels of parasitism have been reported in species such as the two-striped grasshopper (Melanoplus bivittatus), the red-legged grasshopper (Melanoplus femurrubrum), the migratory grasshopper (Melanoplus sanguinipes), the snakeweed grasshopper (Hesperotettix viridis), and the desert locust (Schistocerca gregaria). Once it is ingested by an insect such as a grasshopper, an egg hatches almost immediately, sometimes within an hour. The juvenile nematode pierces the gut with its stylet and enters the hemocoel, the blood-like fluid that fills the insect's body cavity, acting as a circulatory system. There the nematode absorbs the insect's nutrients, taking glucose directly through its cuticle. It grows and develops over several weeks. The newly hatched nematode is about 0.24 millimetres long; by day 37 it has reached about 5 centimetres. The nematodes grow more rapidly and attain larger sizes in larger insect hosts. More females occur in larger hosts, as well. The nematode is still a juvenile when it emerges from the host insect, and finishes its development in the soil. The insect dies as the nematode exits its body, if not before. The adult nematode does not feed.

== Behaviour ==
M. nigrescens exhibits positive phototaxis; when it senses light with its eye, it moves toward it. Other eyed nematodes have a negative phototaxis, moving away from light. The juvenile M. nigrescens also has a weak negative phototaxis before its eye has developed. This behaviour may guide the juvenile underground, and lead the adult female to the surface, where it lays its eggs on vegetation.

The nematode moves in a unique fashion, as well. The anterior tip of the body containing the eye swings horizontally and vertically while the "neck" region just behind it bends slowly. This is apparently a scanning behaviour, in which the nematode senses light and determines its direction. Rather than undulating as nematodes generally do, this species moves its body as several independent sections, pushing off of objects with some sections while others loop upward. It also crawls on its ventral surface "like a snake", rather than on its side like a typical nematode.

== Ecology ==
In naturally infected earwig hosts (Forficula auricularia) in New Zealand a prevalence of 7.8% was observed. With around 10% of individuals carrying multiple worms. The highest observed number of M. nigrescens in one host was 5.

When infecting earwigs the parasite is able to induce positive hydrotaxis. Larger M. nigrescens are more likely to induce positive hydrotaxis which is probably related to maturation of the worms.
