= Reesimermis nielseni =

Scientific classification
- Domain: Eukaryota
- Kingdom: Animalia
- Phylum: Nematoda
- Class: Enoplea
- Order: Mermithida
- Family: Mermithidae
- Genus: Reesimermis
- Species: R. nielseni

Binomial name
- Reesimermis nielseni Tsai & Grundmann, 1969

Species of roundworm

Reesimermis nielseni is a nematode in the family Mermithidae. It is a parasite of the larvae of mosquitoes, spending part of its life cycle in its host's body cavity and part in the water as a free-living worm. It has been investigated as a biological pest control agent to control mosquitoes.

== Description ==
This nematode grows to an average length of 15 mm (0.6 in); It tends to be longer in larger hosts and shorter when there are several parasites in one host.

== Ecology ==
Reesimermis nielseni is a parasite of the larvae of mosquitoes. It is known to infect 22 different species of mosquito in the wild and another 33 species in the laboratory.

On emerging from their host larvae, these nematodes fall to the bottom of the water body. They become sexually mature in about sixty days and females lay a total of around 2,500 eggs over a period of eighteen days or so. The eggs hatch after four weeks and each preparasitic larva searches for a suitable host; it will die if it does not find one within seventy-two hours. It bores a hole through the cuticle of the host mosquito larva with a stylet, and develops in its body cavity. When ready to leave the mosquito larva, it bores a larger hole through which it emerges. The mosquito larva does not survive because its body fluids leak out through the hole.
