= Amphibiomermis =

Scientific classification
- Domain: Eukaryota
- Kingdom: Animalia
- Phylum: Nematoda
- Class: Enoplea
- Order: Mermithida
- Family: Mermithidae
- Genus: Amphibiomermis; Artyukhovskii, 1969

Genus of roundworms

Amphibiomermis is a genus of nematodes belonging to the family Mermithidae.

The genus was first described by Artyukhovsky in 1969.

Species:

- Amphibiomermis ghilarovi Pologenzev & Artyukhovsky, 1958
- Amphibiomermis kirjanovae Pologenzev & Artyukhovsky, 1958
- Amphibiomermis kralli Rubtsov, 1973
- Amphibiomermis paramonovi Pologenzev & Artyukhovsky, 1958
- Amphibiomermis polycentrus Rubtsov, 1973
- Amphibiomermis rivalis Artyukhovsky & Khartschenko, 1971
