= Aranimermis =

Scientific classification
- Domain: Eukaryota
- Kingdom: Animalia
- Phylum: Nematoda
- Class: Enoplea
- Order: Mermithida
- Family: Mermithidae
- Genus: Aranimermis; Poinar & Benton, 1986

Genus of roundworms

Aranimermis is a genus of nematodes belonging to the family Mermithidae.

Species:

- Aranimermis aptispicula Poinar & Benton, 1986
- Aranimermis giganteus Poinar & Benton, 1990
