= Backward flying =

Locomotive phenomenon

Backward flying, also known as reverse flying, is a locomotive phenomenon where the object flies in the opposite of its intended flight direction.

== Different fields ==
=== Biology ===
In nature, there are very few organisms who can fly in such manner, making the phenomenon very rare. In the class Aves (birds), there is only one family, Trochilidae (hummingbirds) where the backward flying phenomenon can be found. In the class Insecta (insects), in the suborder Anisoptera (dragonflies), genus Hemaris (bee hawk-moths) (Note: They are better known as hummingbird moths, but since this article already covers hummingbirds (an actual bird), to avoid confusion, we are using instead the less frequently used term, bee hawk-moths.) and order Diptera (true flies), species with this ability can be also found.

There are also some species that don't use the traditional wing flapping mechanism to fly backwards. One such example is the Japanese flying squid, which uses a jet propulsion mechanism for backward flying.

=== Technology ===
In technology, there are some aircraft that can fly backwards. One example is helicopters.

== Efficiency ==
There is no difference in the efficiency between forward flying and backward flying. Although, it was originally thought that backward flying would be much less efficient.

== Similar phenomena ==
Similar to backward flying, backward gliding (Note: Not well established term.) phenomenon also exists in nature. An example of organism that can backward glide is Cephalotes atratus (kaka-sikikoko).
