= Gastromermis =

Scientific classification
- Domain: Eukaryota
- Kingdom: Animalia
- Phylum: Nematoda
- Class: Enoplea
- Order: Mermithida
- Family: Mermithidae
- Genus: Gastromermis; Micoletzky, 1923

Synonyms
- Brevimermis Rubtsov, 1974

Genus of roundworms

Gastromermis is a genus of nematodes belonging to the family Mermithidae.

Species:

- Gastromermis abaquatilis Rubzov & Gafurov, 1977
- Gastromermis acroamphidis Steiner, 1929
