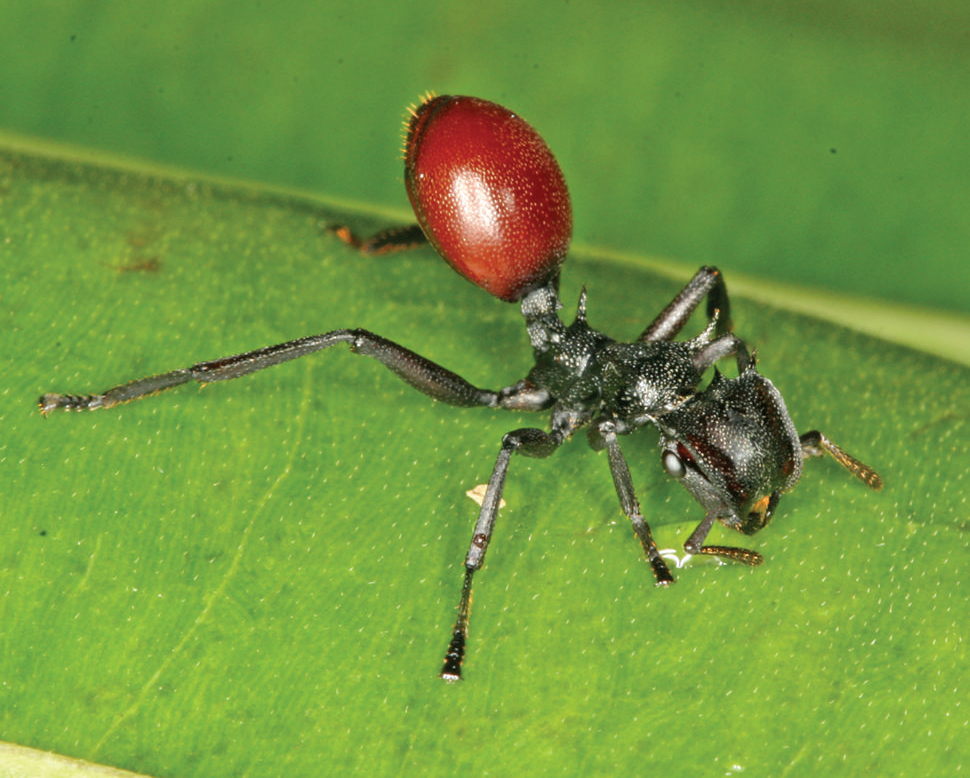
- Cephalotes atratus ant infected with Myrmeconema neotropicum showing swollen red gaster

Scientific classification
- Kingdom: Animalia
- Phylum: Nematoda
- Class: Enoplea
- Order: Mermithida
- Family: Tetradonematidae
- Genus: Myrmeconema
- Species: M. neotropicum

Binomial name
- Myrmeconema neotropicum Poinar & Yanoviak, 2008

= Myrmeconema neotropicum =

Species of roundworm

Myrmeconema neotropicum is a tetradonematid nematode parasite. It appears to induce fruit mimicry in the tropical ant. Presently, the only known host species is Cephalotes atratus, a South American ant with a black abdomen. Upon infection, the gaster, or bulbous hindmost region of the abdomen, resembles one of the many red berries in tropical forest canopies.

== Life cycle ==
Myrmeconema neotropicum's life cycle begins when a bird eats the infected ant. The eggs are defecated out of the bird's digestive system. The ants then pick up the eggs and feed them to their larvae. Once inside the immature ant's gut, the eggs migrate to the gaster, where they will fully mature.

Once the ant larvae pupate, the mature nematodes begin to reproduce inside the gaster. The males expire soon after mating, but the females hold the eggs within themselves. Once the ant develops into a young adult, the gaster begins to become translucent, thus allowing the red embryos to be seen. The longer the ant is parasitized, the redder the gaster becomes.

The infected ant then travels outside and mimics small red berries, which are a favorite food of frugivorous birds. The ant is confused for a berry and is eaten by the bird, starting the whole cycle over again.

Although bird predation on an infected Cephalotes atratus has not yet been observed, the combination of field experiments and the ant's known natural history indicates that this is the most parsimonious explanation for the parasite's transmission to new ant colonies.

== Signs and symptoms ==
Infected ants develop bright red gasters, tend to be more sluggish, and walk in a conspicuous elevated position with their gasters. According to Shik et al. (2011), infected gasters had 57% more mass but 37% lower metabolic rates than uninfected gasters. These changes likely cause frugivorous birds to mistake the infected ants for berries and eat them. Increased reddening coincides with a shift in ant behavior that includes foraging outside the nest, thus increasing the probability of consumption by a duped bird.

== Morphology ==
Female Myrmeconema neotropicum mature within the gaster of the host ants. They are about 1 mm in length and about 112 μm at their greatest width. Males are smaller than females (680 μm in length and 97 μm in diameter) (Poinar & Yanoviak 2008). The infected young adult ant is completely black and spends most of its time tending brood within the nest. As the parasite embryos develop within the eggs, the ant gaster becomes translucent, ultimately appearing bright red.
