= Pheromermis =

Scientific classification
- Domain: Eukaryota
- Kingdom: Animalia
- Phylum: Nematoda
- Class: Enoplea
- Order: Mermithida
- Family: Mermithidae
- Genus: Pheromermis; Poinar, Lane & Thomas, 1976

Genus of roundworms

Pheromermis is a genus of nematodes belonging to the family Mermithidae.

The species of this genus are found in North America.

Species:

- Pheromermis montanus Gafurov & Muratova, 1983
- Pheromermis myopis Poinar & Lane, 1978
- Pheromermis myrmecophila (Baylis, 1921)
- Pheromermis pachysoma (von Linstow, 1905)
- Pheromermis robustus Gafurov & Muratova, 1983
- Pheromermis rubzovi Andreeva & Spiridonov, 1986
- Pheromermis tabani Rubzov & Andreeva, 1980
- Pheromermis tabanivora Gafurov, Sorokina & Muratova, 1986
- Pheromermis vernalis Rubzov & Andreeva, 1980
- Pheromermis vesparum Kaiser, 1987
- Pheromermis villosa Kaiser, 1986
- Pheromermis zaamini Gafurov, Kadyrova & Normatov, 1979
