= Bathymermis =

Scientific classification
- Domain: Eukaryota
- Kingdom: Animalia
- Phylum: Nematoda
- Class: Enoplea
- Order: Mermithida
- Family: Mermithidae
- Genus: Bathymermis; Daday, 1911

Genus of roundworms

Bathymermis is a genus of nematodes belonging to the family Mermithidae.

Species:

- Bathymermis brevicauda Rubzov, 1972
- Bathymermis fuhrmani Daday, 1911
