= Lanceimermis =

Scientific classification
- Domain: Eukaryota
- Kingdom: Animalia
- Phylum: Nematoda
- Class: Enoplea
- Order: Mermithida
- Family: Mermithidae
- Genus: Lanceimermis; Artyukhovskii, 1969

Genus of roundworms

Lanceimermis is a genus of nematodes belonging to the family Mermithidae.

Species:

- Lanceimermis austriaca (Micoletzky, 1914)
- Lanceimermis baikalensis Rubzov, 1976
