= Quadrimermis =

Scientific classification
- Kingdom: Animalia
- Phylum: Nematoda
- Class: Enoplea
- Order: Mermithida
- Family: Mermithidae
- Genus: Quadrimermis; Coman, 1961

Genus of nematodes

Quadrimermis is a genus of nematodes belonging to the family Mermithidae.

Species:

- Quadrimermis coramnica Coman, 1961
- Quadrimermis lovatensis Rubzov, 1979
- Quadrimermis pikkjarvensis Rubzov, 1979
- Quadrimermis vyrtsjarvi Rubzov, 1978
