= Tetramermis =

Scientific classification
- Domain: Eukaryota
- Kingdom: Animalia
- Phylum: Nematoda
- Class: Enoplea
- Order: Mermithida
- Family: Mermithidae
- Genus: Tetramermis; Steiner, 1925

Genus of roundworms

Tetramermis is a genus of nematodes belonging to the family Mermithidae.

Species:

- Tetramermis lacustris Rubzov, 1978
- Tetramermis tenuis (Leidy, 1878)
- Tetramermis ventrosoma Rubzov, 1978
