= Strelkovimermis =

Scientific classification
- Domain: Eukaryota
- Kingdom: Animalia
- Phylum: Nematoda
- Class: Enoplea
- Order: Mermithida
- Family: Mermithidae
- Genus: Strelkovimermis; Rubzov, 1969

Genus of roundworms

Strelkovimermis is a genus of nematodes belonging to the family Mermithidae.

Species:

- Strelkovimermis acuticauda Johnson & Kleve, 1996
- Strelkovimermis amphidis Johnson & Kleve, 2000
