= Reesimermis =

Scientific classification
- Domain: Eukaryota
- Kingdom: Animalia
- Phylum: Nematoda
- Class: Enoplea
- Order: Mermithida
- Family: Mermithidae
- Genus: Reesimermis; Tsai & Grundman, 1969

Type species
- Reesimermis nielseni Tsai & Grundman, 1969

Genus of nematodes

Reesimermis is a genus of nematodes belonging to the family Mermithidae.

Species:

- Reesimermis jacutensis Rubzov, 1979
- Reesimermis nielseni Tsai & Grundman, 1969
- Reesimermis pikaninensis Rubzov, 1979
