= Hydromermis =

Scientific classification
- Domain: Eukaryota
- Kingdom: Animalia
- Phylum: Nematoda
- Class: Enoplea
- Order: Mermithida
- Family: Mermithidae
- Genus: Hydromermis; Corti, 1902

Synonyms
- Dispimermis Rubtsov, 1980

Genus of roundworms

Hydromermis is a genus of Mermithidae.

The genus was described in 1902 by Corti.

Species:

- Hydromermis contorta
- Hydromermis grandis
