= Spiculimermis =

Scientific classification
- Domain: Eukaryota
- Kingdom: Animalia
- Phylum: Nematoda
- Class: Enoplea
- Order: Mermithida
- Family: Mermithidae
- Genus: Spiculimermis; Artyukhovskii, 1963

Genus of roundworms

Spiculimermis is a genus of nematodes belonging to the family Mermithidae.

Species:

- Spiculimermis acaudata Rubzov, 1976
- Spiculimermis angusta Rubzov, 1972
