= Abathymermis =

Scientific classification
- Domain: Eukaryota
- Kingdom: Animalia
- Phylum: Nematoda
- Class: Enoplea
- Order: Mermithida
- Family: Mermithidae
- Genus: Abathymermis; Rubtsov, 1871

Extant species
- See text

Genus of nematodes

Abathymermis is a genus of nematodes belonging to the family Mermithidae.

The genus was described in 1871 by Ivan Rubtsov.

Species:

- Abathymermis bissacea Rubtsov, 1973
- Abathymermis fiseri Johnson & Kleve, 1995
- Abathymermis ivaschkini Gafurov, 1980
- Abathymermis oesophaga Gafurov & An, 1989
- Abathymermis parva Rubtsov, 1973
- Abathymermis shocki Johnson & Kleve, 1995
