= Hesperotettix floridensis =

Scientific classification
- Kingdom: Animalia
- Phylum: Arthropoda
- Clade: Pancrustacea
- Class: Insecta
- Order: Orthoptera
- Suborder: Caelifera
- Family: Acrididae
- Tribe: Melanoplini
- Genus: Hesperotettix
- Species: H. floridensis

Binomial name
- Hesperotettix floridensis Morse, 1901

Species of grasshopper

Hesperotettix floridensis, known generally as the Florida purple-striped grasshopper or Florida purple-striped locust, is a species of spur-throated grasshopper in the family Acrididae. It is found in North America.
