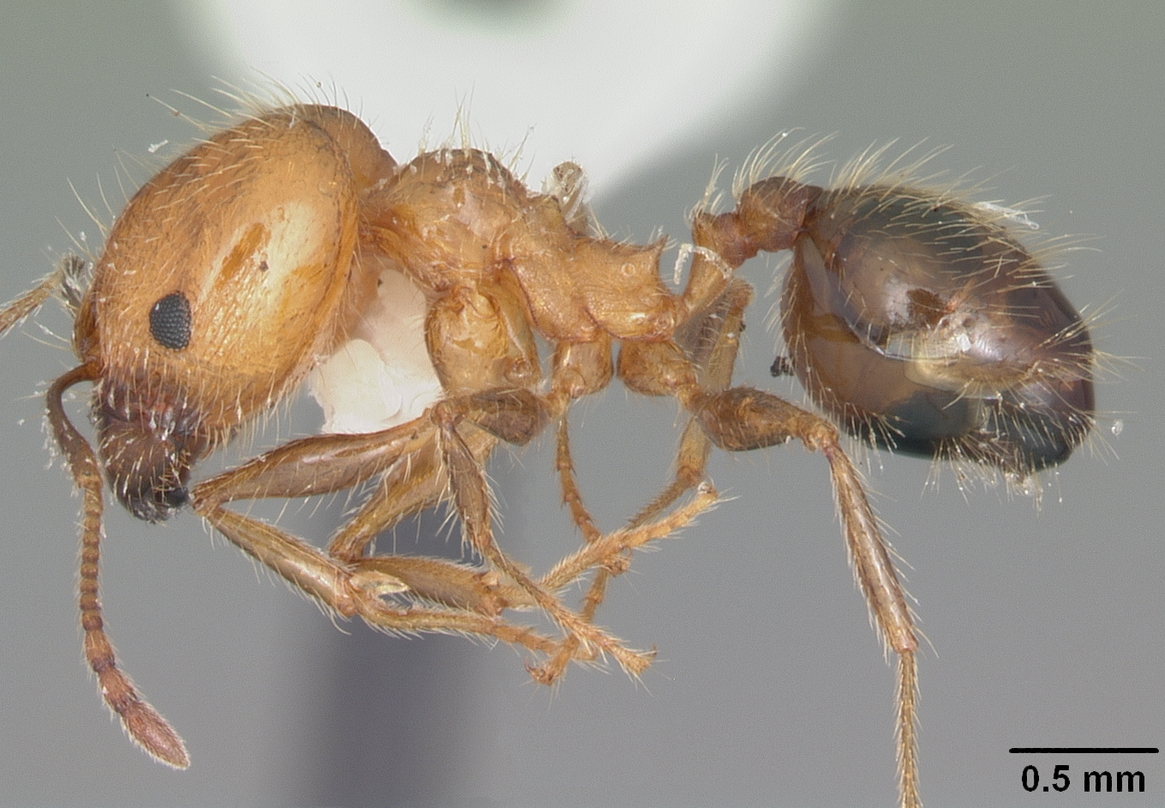

Scientific classification
- Kingdom: Animalia
- Phylum: Arthropoda
- Class: Insecta
- Order: Hymenoptera
- Family: Formicidae
- Subfamily: Myrmicinae
- Genus: Pheidole
- Species: P. dentata

Binomial name
- Pheidole dentata Mayr, 1886

= Pheidole dentata =

Species of ant

Pheidole dentata is a species of ant in the subfamily Myrmicinae. It is distributed in North America, from the Mid-Atlantic states and southeastern United States to Mexico.

== Neurochemistry ==
P. dentata takes on more and more tasks in the colony as it gets older, which requires it to respond to more and more olfactory cues in the course of performing them. This broadening olfactory response repertoire was demonstrated by Seid and Traniello 2006 to go along with increased serotonin and dopamine, but not octopamine.

== See also ==
- Mermithergate
