= Hesperotettix curtipennis =

Scientific classification
- Kingdom: Animalia
- Phylum: Arthropoda
- Clade: Pancrustacea
- Class: Insecta
- Order: Orthoptera
- Suborder: Caelifera
- Family: Acrididae
- Tribe: Melanoplini
- Genus: Hesperotettix
- Species: H. curtipennis

Binomial name
- Hesperotettix curtipennis Scudder, 1897

Species of grasshopper

Hesperotettix curtipennis is a species of spur-throated grasshopper in the family Acrididae. It is found in North America.
