= Hesperotettix pacificus =

Scientific classification
- Kingdom: Animalia
- Phylum: Arthropoda
- Clade: Pancrustacea
- Class: Insecta
- Order: Orthoptera
- Suborder: Caelifera
- Family: Acrididae
- Tribe: Melanoplini
- Genus: Hesperotettix
- Species: H. pacificus

Binomial name
- Hesperotettix pacificus Scudder, 1897

Species of grasshopper

Hesperotettix pacificus is a species of spur-throated grasshopper in the family Acrididae. It is found in North America.

== Subspecies ==
These two subspecies belong to the species Hesperotettix pacificus:

- H. pacificus capillatus Hebard, 1919^{i c g}
- H. pacificus pacificus Scudder, 1897^{i c g}

Data sources: i = ITIS, c = Catalogue of Life, g = GBIF, b = Bugguide.net
