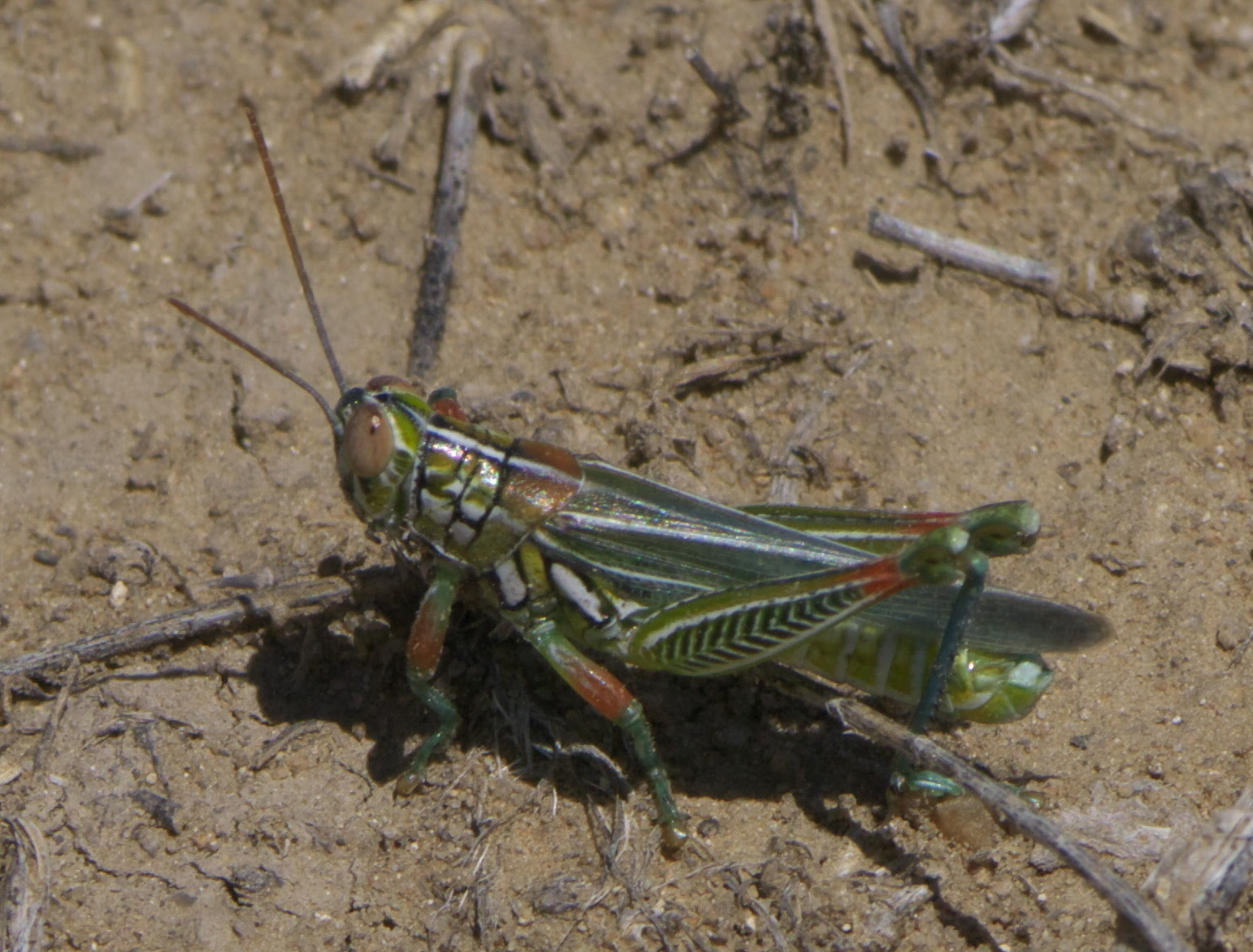
- Hesperotettix viridis

Scientific classification
- Kingdom: Animalia
- Phylum: Arthropoda
- Clade: Pancrustacea
- Class: Insecta
- Order: Orthoptera
- Suborder: Caelifera
- Family: Acrididae
- Subfamily: Melanoplinae
- Tribe: Melanoplini
- Genus: Hesperotettix; Scudder, 1875

= Hesperotettix =

Genus of grasshoppers

Hesperotettix is a genus of spur-throated grasshoppers in the family Acrididae. There are about 9 described species in Hesperotettix.

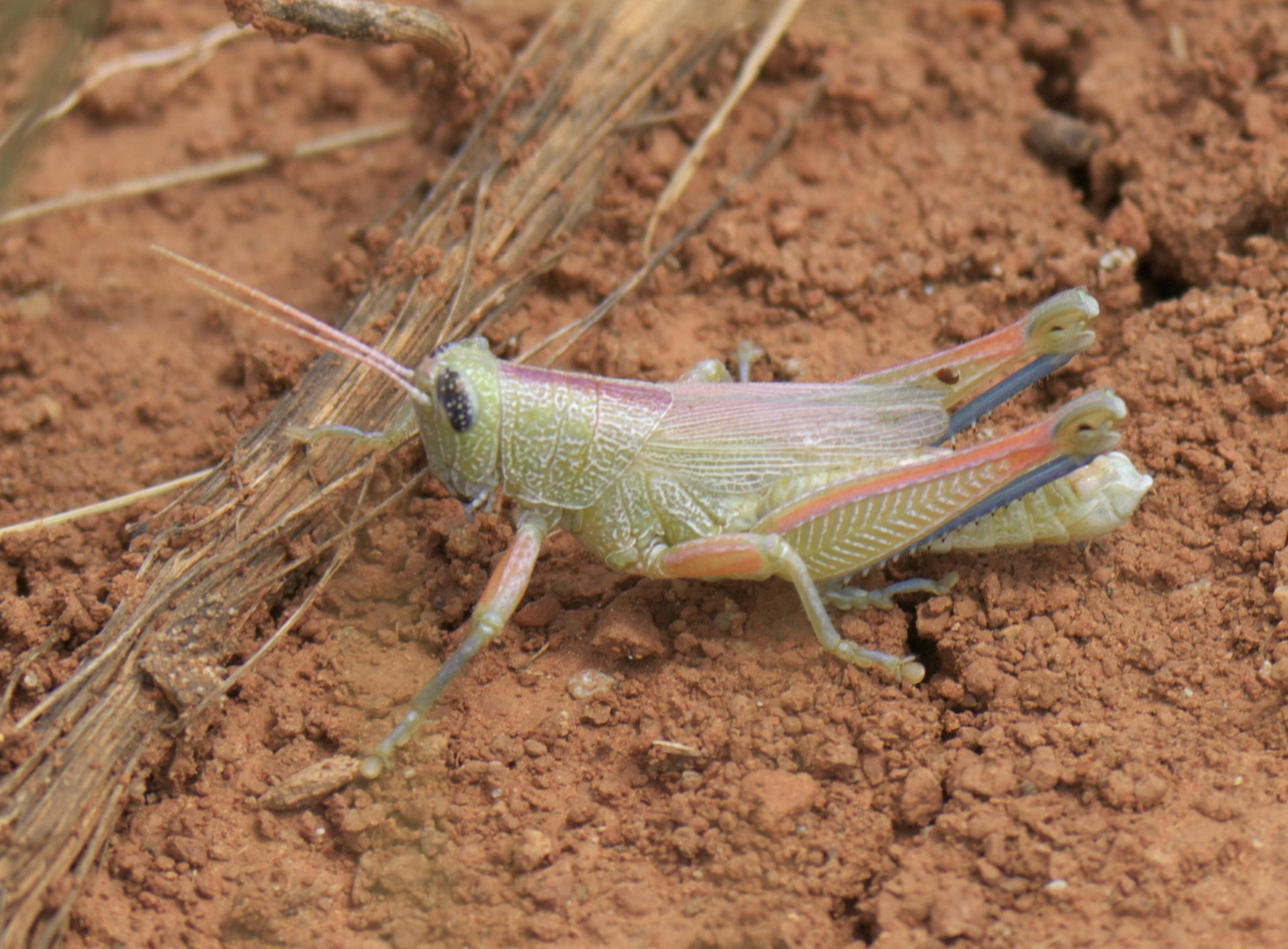
Hesperotettix speciosus

== Species ==
- Hesperotettix coloradensis Bruner, 1904
- Hesperotettix curtipennis Scudder, 1897
- Hesperotettix floridensis Morse, 1901 (Florida purple-striped grasshopper)
- Hesperotettix gemmicula Hebard, 1918
- Hesperotettix nevadensis Morse, 1906
- Hesperotettix osceola Hebard, 1918 (osceola grasshopper)
- Hesperotettix pacificus Scudder, 1897
- Hesperotettix speciosus (Scudder, 1872) (showy grasshopper)
- Hesperotettix viridis (Thomas, 1872) (snakeweed grasshopper)
