= Mermithogyne =

Usually characterised by shortened wings, mermithogynes are found in parts of the Formicidae, being queens affected by parasitic nematode worms of the genus Mermis.

== See also ==
- Mermithergate
- Polymorphism (biology)
