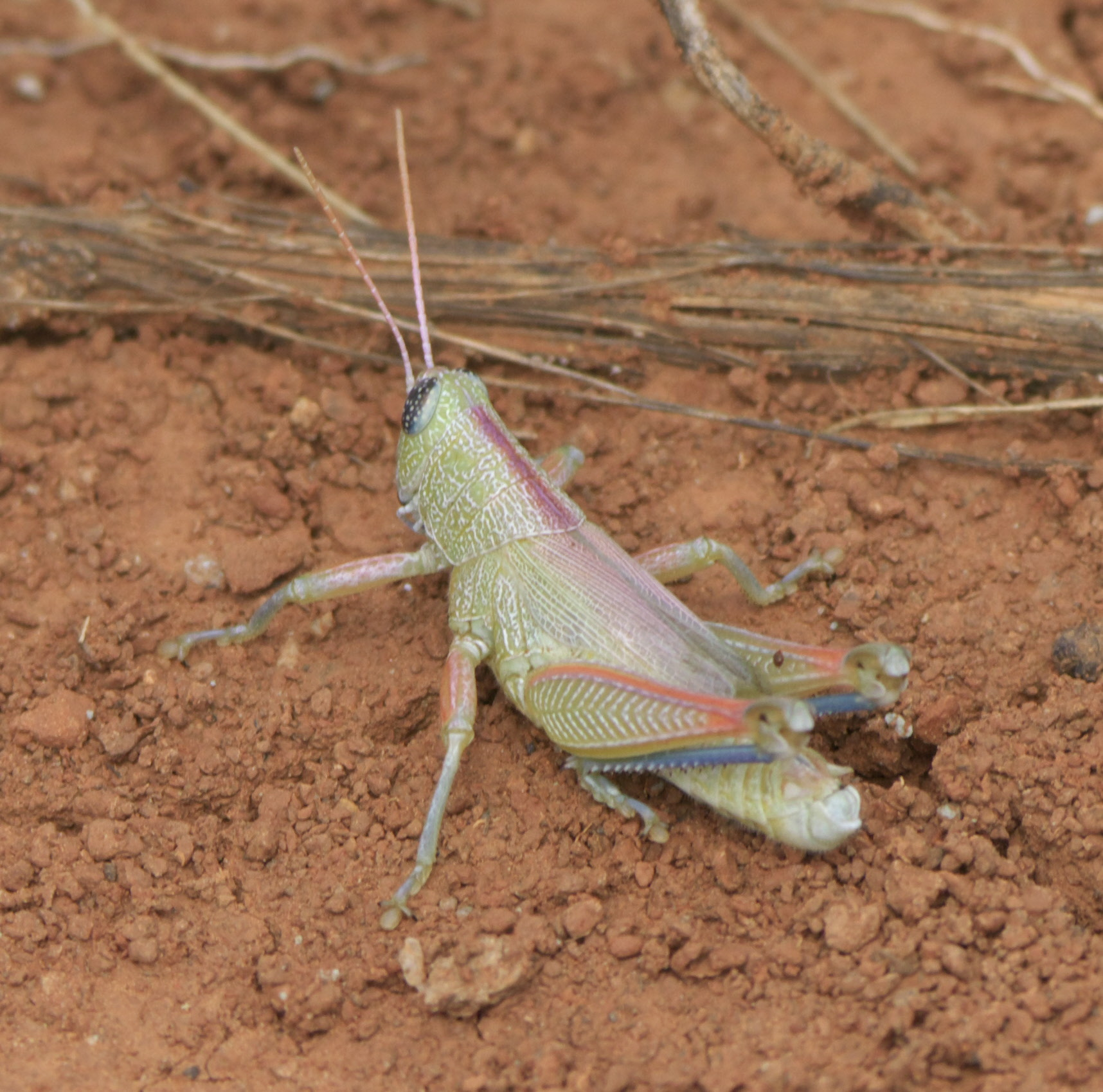

Scientific classification
- Kingdom: Animalia
- Phylum: Arthropoda
- Clade: Pancrustacea
- Class: Insecta
- Order: Orthoptera
- Suborder: Caelifera
- Family: Acrididae
- Tribe: Melanoplini
- Genus: Hesperotettix
- Species: H. speciosus

Binomial name
- Hesperotettix speciosus (Scudder, 1872)

= Hesperotettix speciosus =

Species of grasshopper

Hesperotettix speciosus, known generally as the showy grasshopper or handsome purple-striped grasshopper, is a species of spur-throated grasshopper in the family Acrididae. It is found in North America.

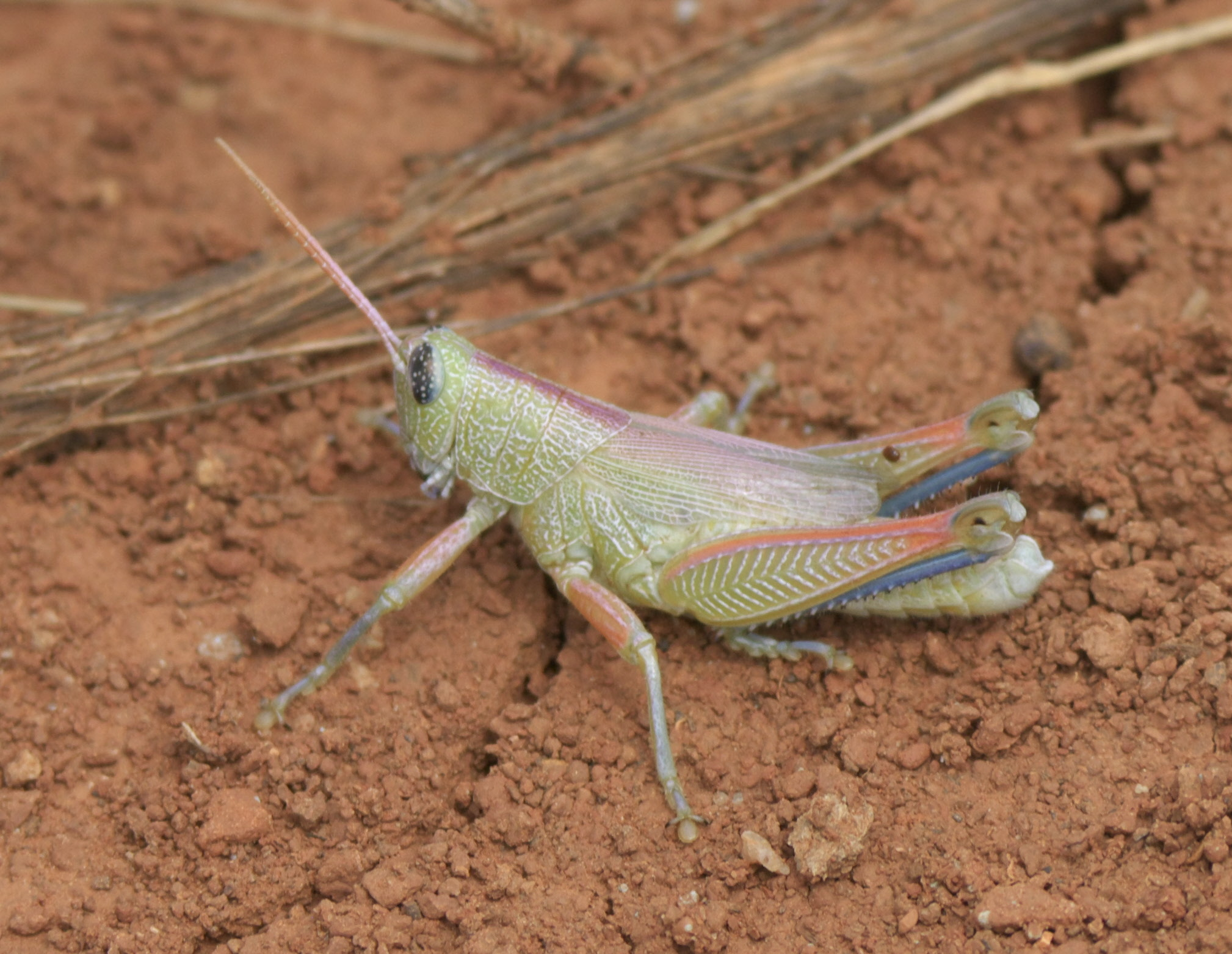
Showy grasshopper, Hesperotettix speciosus

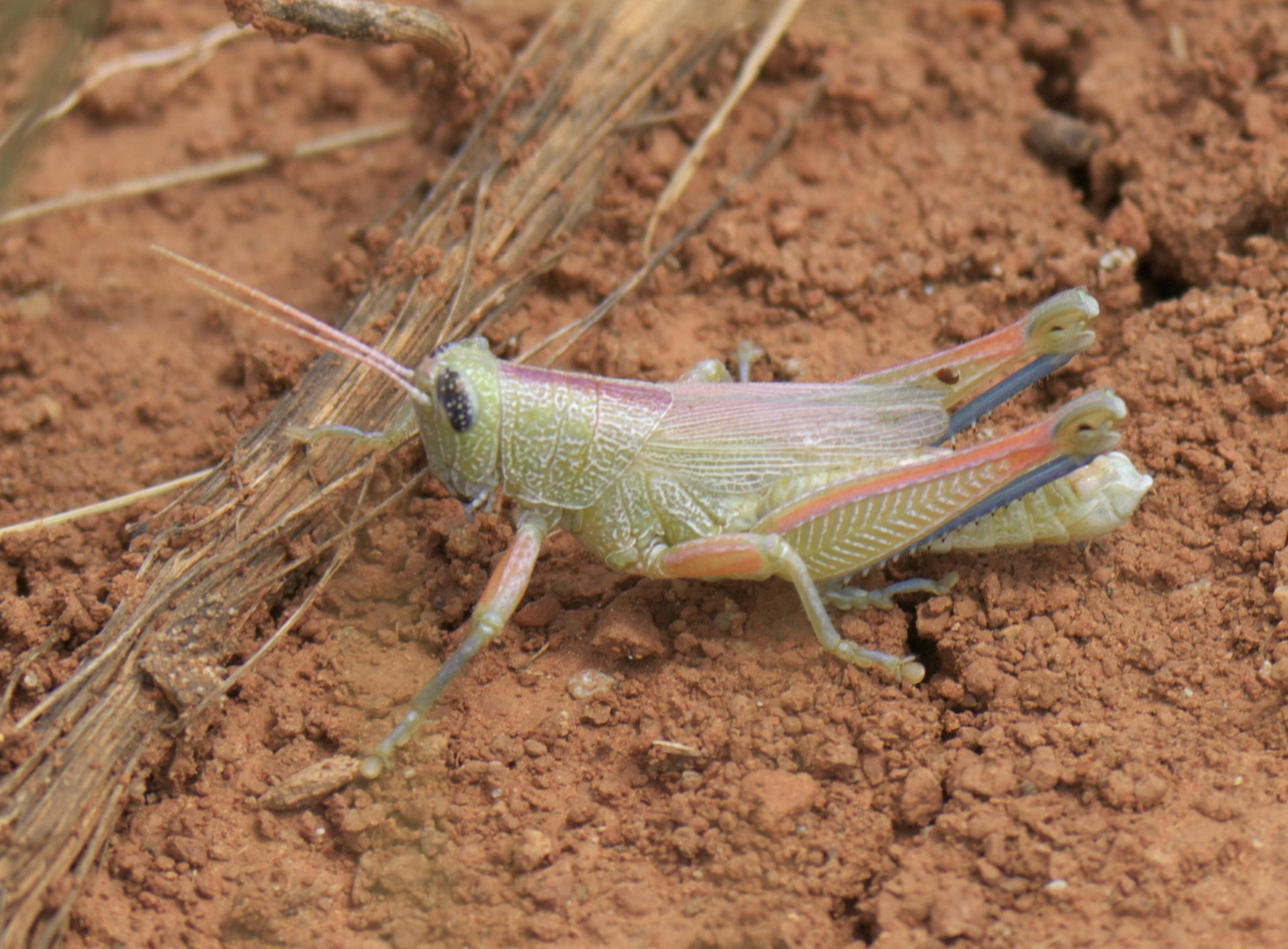
Showy grasshopper, Hesperotettix speciosus
