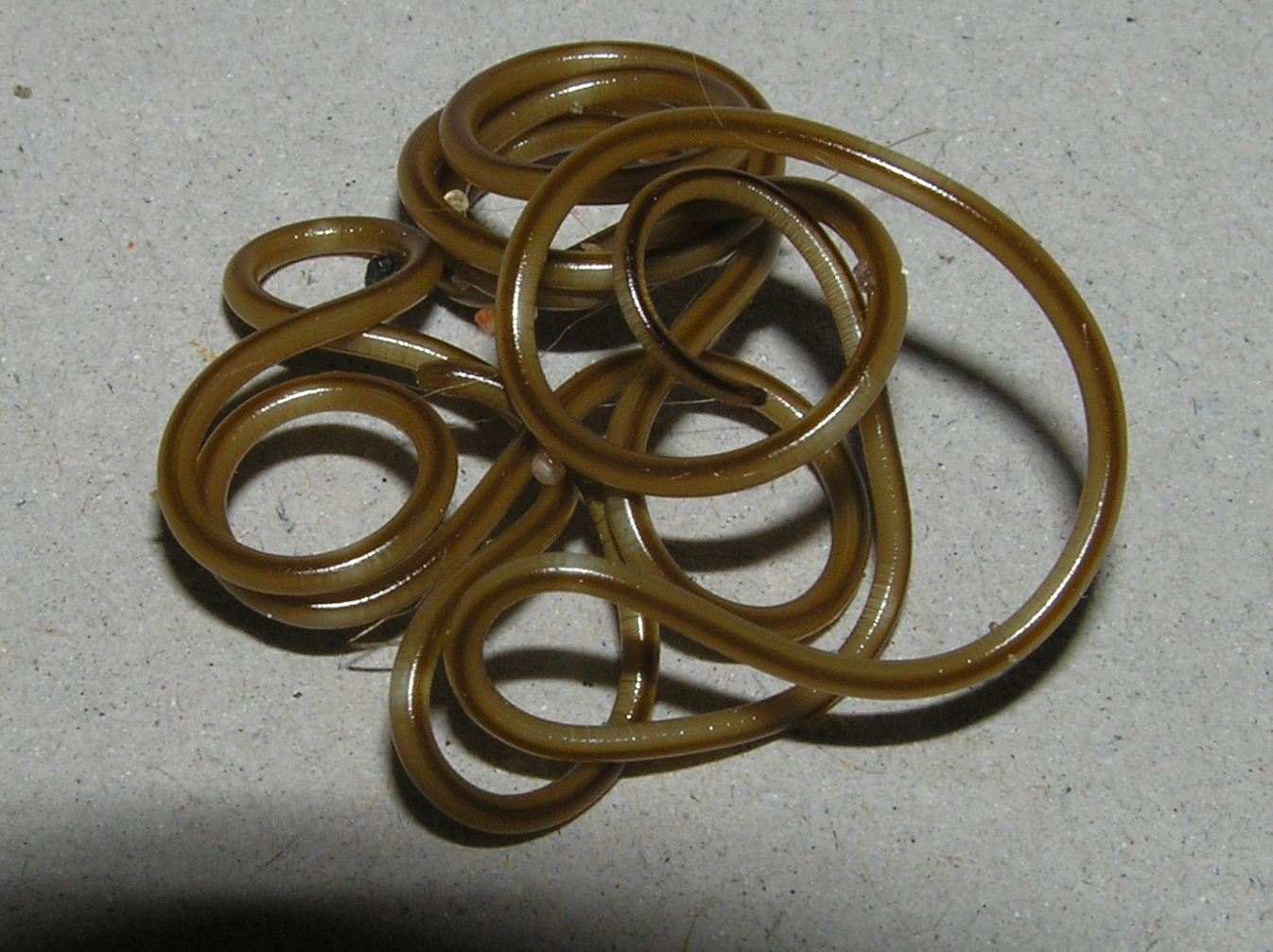
- Mermis nigrescens

Scientific classification
- Domain: Eukaryota
- Kingdom: Animalia
- Phylum: Nematoda
- Class: Enoplea
- Order: Mermithida
- Family: Mermithidae
- Genus: Mermis; Dujardin, 1842

Type species
- Mermis nigrescens Dujardin, 1842

= Mermis =

Genus of roundworms

Mermis is a genus of nematodes belonging to the family Mermithidae.

The genus has almost cosmopolitan distribution.

== Species ==
At least 11 species currently belong to the genus:

- Mermis athysanota Steiner, 1921
- Mermis changodudus Poinar, Rémillet & Van Waerebeke, 1978
- Mermis gigantea Artyukovsky & Lisikova, 1977
- Mermis kenyensis Baylis, 1944
- Mermis mirabilis von Linstow, 1903
- Mermis nigrescens Dujardin, 1842
- Mermis papillus Gafurov, 1982
- Mermis paranigrescens Rubzov, 1976
- Mermis quirindiensis Baker & Poinar, 1986
- Mermis savaiiensis Orton Williams, 1984
- Mermis xianensis Xu & Bao, 1995
