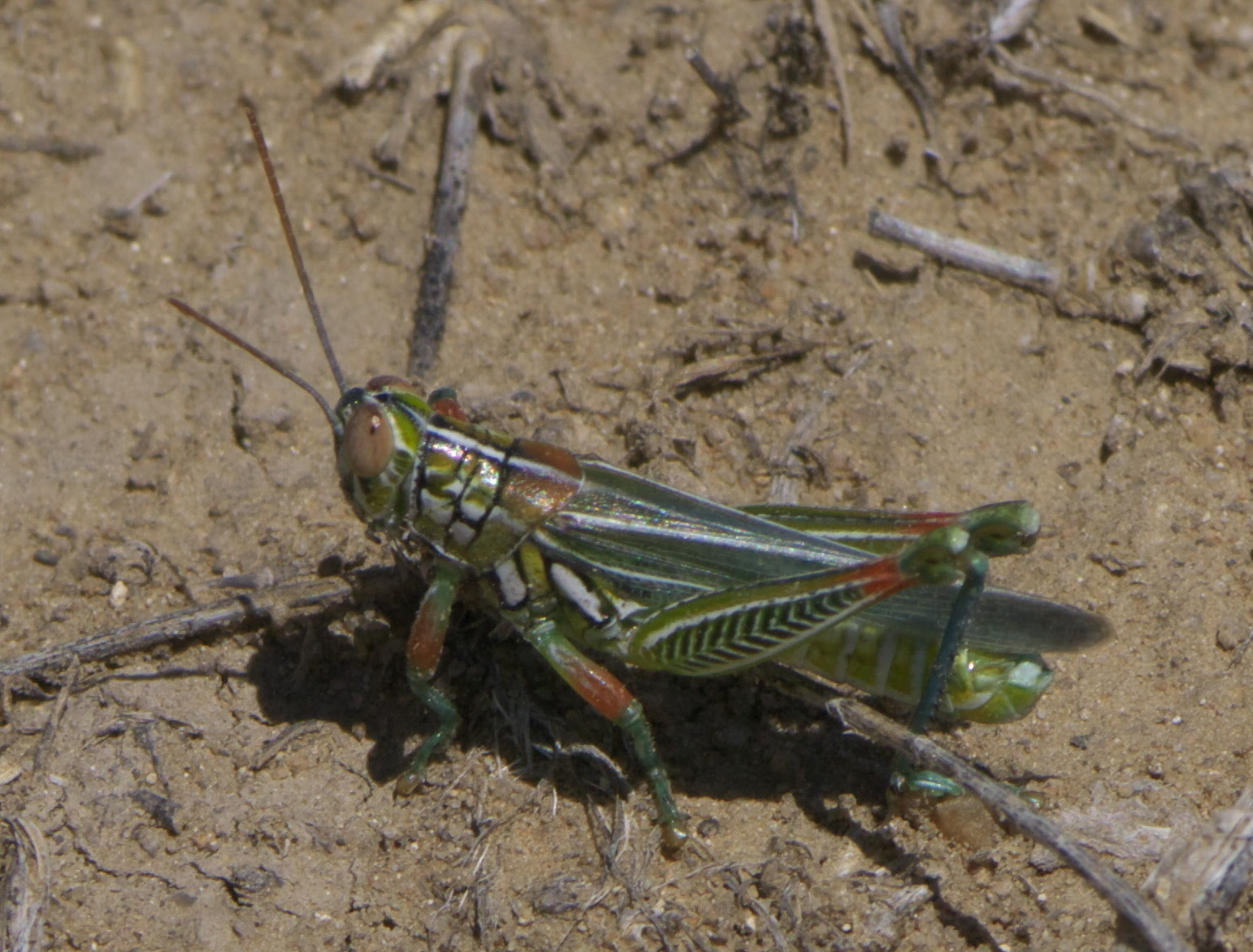

Scientific classification
- Kingdom: Animalia
- Phylum: Arthropoda
- Clade: Pancrustacea
- Class: Insecta
- Order: Orthoptera
- Suborder: Caelifera
- Family: Acrididae
- Genus: Hesperotettix
- Species: H. viridis

Binomial name
- Hesperotettix viridis (Thomas, 1872)

= Hesperotettix viridis =

Species of grasshopper

Hesperotettix viridis, known generally as the snakeweed grasshopper or meadow purple-striped grasshopper, is a species of spur-throated grasshopper in the family Acrididae. It is found in North America.

== Subspecies ==
- Hesperotettix viridis brevipennis (Thomas, 1874)
- Hesperotettix viridis nevadensis (short-winged snakeweed grasshopper)
- Hesperotettix viridis pratensis Scudder, 1897 (purple-striped grasshopper)
- Hesperotettix viridis viridis (Thomas, 1872) (snakeweed grasshopper)
