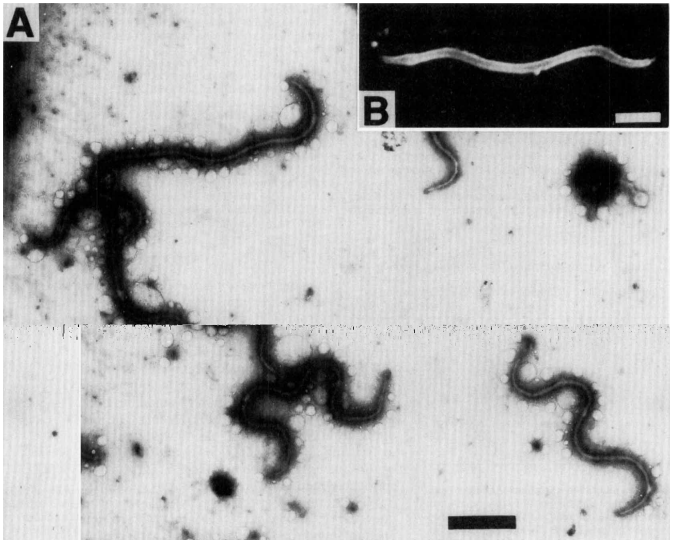

Scientific classification
- Domain: Bacteria
- Kingdom: Pseudomonadati
- Phylum: Spirochaetota
- Class: Spirochaetia
- Order: Brevinematales
- Family: Brevinemataceae; Paster 2012
- Genus: Brevinema; Defosse et al. 1995
- Species: B. andersonii

Binomial name
- Brevinema andersonii Defosse et al. 1995

= Brevinema andersonii =

Species of bacterium

Brevinema andersonii (Brev. i. ne' ma. L. adj. brevis, short; Gr. n. nema, thread; N.L. neut. n. Brevinema, a short thread.) (an.derso'ni.i. N.L. gen. n. andersonii, of Anderson), named for John F. Anderson, who first described the organism. This organism is a Gram-negative, microaerophilic, helical shaped, chemoorganotrophic organism from the genus Brevinema. Brevinema andersonii is host associated, strains have been isolated from blood and other tissues of short-tailed shrews (Blarina brevicauda) and white-footed mice (Peromyscus Zeucopus) and are infectious for laboratory mice and Syrian hamsters.B. andersonii is readily identified by restriction enzyme analysis, and SDS-PAGE, or fatty acid composition data. Another identifier for B. andersonii is the sheathed periplasmic flagella in the 1-2-1 configuration. While cells are visible by dark-field or phase-contrast microscopy, they cannot be seen when bright-field microscopy is used.

== History ==
Brevinema andersonii was first identified in 1987 by Anderson F. John, Russell C. Johnson, Louis A.Magnarell, Fred W. Hyde, and Theodore G Andreadis in blood and tissues from Blarina brevicauda (short-tailed shrew) and Peromyscus leucopus (white-footed mouse). Initially thought to be associated with Borrelia burgdorferi this organism was finally brought to light with more advanced growth mediums. Upon electron microscopy of cultures from this medium, a distinct morphology stood out from the rest. It was not until 1995 that a push for this organism to be found as a new species. This push came as an article from the Journal of Systematic Bacteriology that exclaimed data supports this organism to be its own genus species was broadcast. Written by D.L. Defosse, R. C. Johnson, B. J. Paster, F. E. Dewhirst, they found genomic evidence to support their claim that Brevienma andersonii was its own deep rooted spirochete. Their findings showed that this organism was around 75% similar in genome to other known spirochetes, this showed that B. andersonii was in a taxon of its own.

== Biology and biochemistry ==
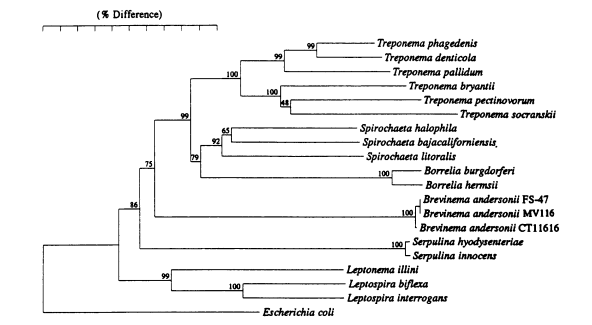

=== Type and morphology ===
Brevinema andersonii stains as G- due to the peptidoglycan in the triple-layered outer membrane. Its metabolism is chemoorganotrophic. The organism exists in microaerophilic environments. B. andersonii is a motile and flexible helical shaped spiral bacteria that possess a triple-layered outer envelope. Between the outer membrane and the peptidoglycan layer there is a single sheathed flagella in the 1-2-1 configuration, as well as a protoplasmic cylinder. The cells are usually 0.2–0.3μm in diameter and 4-5μm in length. 1–2 waves occur along the cell with wavelengths of 2-3μm. The typical final density of the cells are around 4×10^{−7} cells per milliliter.

=== Biochemistry ===
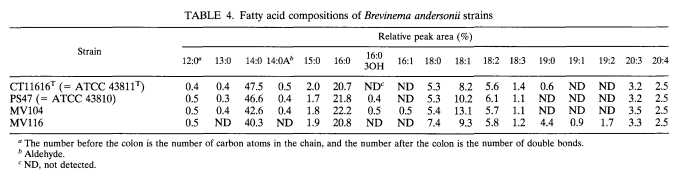

Brevinema andersonii can be readily identified by enzyme analysis and SDS-PAGE, or fatty acid composition data. An enzyme analysis of B. andersonii showed activity with butyrate, valerate, caproate, caprylate, nonanoate, caprate, esterase lipase, alkaline phosphatase, acid phosphatase, and β-glucuronidase. The fatty acid composition mainly consists of myristic acid (14:0), palmitic acid (16:0), and oleic acid (18:l), and smaller amounts of stearic acid (18:1) and linoleic acid (18:2). There were low levels, less than 1%, of other fatty acids detected. B. andersonii was found to be catalase negative.

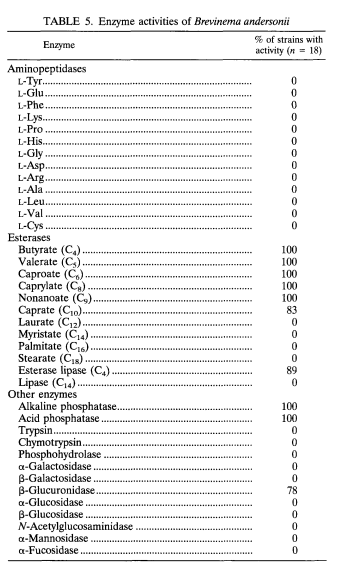

=== Growth ===
Brevenima andersonii was found to be grown successfully on a modified BSK medium, referred to as shrew-mouse spirochete medium. The optimum temperature range that B. andersonii grows at is between 30 °C to 34 °C, but B. andersonii cannot grow below 25 °C. The ideal pH for B. andersonii is neutral with an optimum pH of 7.4. It takes 11 to 14 hours per generation time at optimum conditions.

== Genome ==
The type strain of Brevinema andersonii was designated as ATCC 43811. The G+C content of this organism was fount t be 34 mol%. Unique single-base nucleotide signatures at positions 52•359 (G•C) and 783•799 (U•A) differentiate B. andersonii from other major spirochete groups. There is also a distinguishing 16S rRNA sequence that corresponds to position 724 to 750 in E. coli (5'-GGCAGCUACCUAUGCUAAGAUUGACGC-3'). The 16S rRNA genome is extracted was a partial genome with 1490 bp, the 16S rRNA partial genome reads as:
