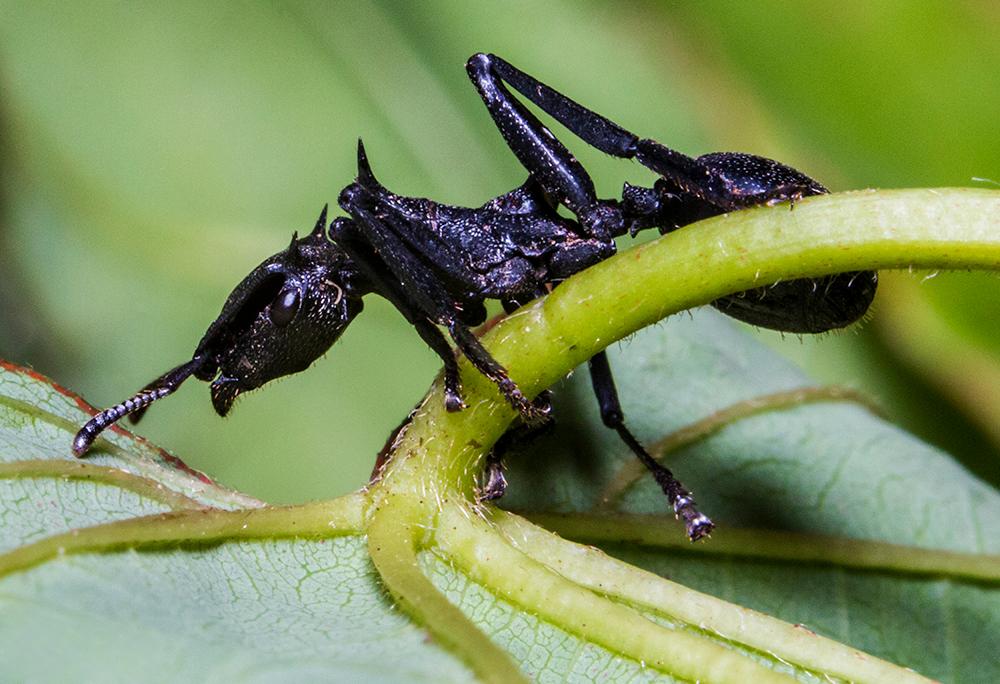

Scientific classification
- Kingdom: Animalia
- Phylum: Arthropoda
- Clade: Pancrustacea
- Class: Insecta
- Order: Hymenoptera
- Family: Formicidae
- Subfamily: Myrmicinae
- Genus: Cephalotes
- Species: C. atratus

Binomial name
- Cephalotes atratus (Linnaeus, 1758)

Synonyms
- Formica atrata Linnaeus, 1758; Cephalotes quadridens Retzius, 1783; Cephalotes dubitatus Smith, 1858

= Cephalotes atratus =

Species of ant

Cephalotes atratus is a species of arboreal ant in the genus Cephalotes, a genus characterized by its odd shaped head. These ants are known as gliding ants because of their ability to "parachute" by steering their fall if they lose their footing.

== Names ==
It is called kaka-sikikoko in the Kwaza language of Rondônia, Brazil.

== Description ==
Cephalotes atratus is a large, mainly black ant; workers are 8 to 14 mm (0.3 to 0.6 in) in length and females 20 mm (0.8 in). Males are up to 14 mm (0.55 in) and have black heads and thoraxes, and dark reddish-brown gasters and limbs. The workers are spiny and heavily armoured with powerful mandibles for chewing through wood.

== Distribution ==
This ant occurs in lowland tropical rainforests in South America where its range extends from Panama and Venezuela to Peru, Bolivia, Paraguay, Uruguay and northern Argentina. It is a common arboreal species and colonies are found in forested areas, parkland with isolated trees, and urban habitats.

== Biology ==
This ant usually builds its nest in a hollow in a large live or dead tree. A small entrance may lead to a complex of tunnels and chambers, all excavated by the ants. From the nest the workers emerge by day to forage on other parts of the tree, or cross to contiguous trees, and make use of the crevices in the bark as runways to descend to the ground where they also forage. Auxiliary nests may sometimes be found a little apart from the main colony.

== Ecology ==
Cephalotes atratus is omnivorous and feeds on what it can find. A major part of the diet is the secretions produced by treehoppers. Ants on the ground collect insect remains from bird droppings, and it will feed on carrion and garbage as well as attack other insects. It does not seem to eat plant material. The armouring is sufficiently heavy to prevent predation by similar sized attackers. In one instance, a troop of army ants Nomamyrmex esenbeckii was seen attacking a colony, and the C. atratus workers made a living wall to defend the entrance, aligning their heavily sclerotised heads to prevent the army ants from getting inside to attack their brood.

This ant is the only known definitive host of the nematode Myrmeconema neotropicum. The ants bring infected bird faeces back to the colony to feed to their young. As the ant develops, the nematode also develops and moves to the gaster in the ant's abdomen. This is where the adult nematodes mate and the eggs begin to develop within the female nematode. These developing embryos are the cause of the red colour in infected ants' abdomens. Older ants are sent out to forage while the eggs in infected ants develop and cause the abdomen to become red and look similar to a berry. Frugivorous birds (a paratenic host) then eat the ant abdomen containing the eggs; the eggs are then expelled through the bird's faeces, continuing the parasite's lifecycle.
