= Tetradonematidae =

Scientific classification
- Kingdom: Animalia
- Phylum: Nematoda
- Class: Enoplea
- Order: Mermithida
- Superfamily: Mermithoidea
- Family: Tetradonematidae

Family of roundworms

Tetradonematidae is a family of nematodes, most being endoparasites of arthropods. A species discovered in 2008 was found to alter the morphology of its ant host, apparently so as to make the ant resemble fruits leading to their predation by birds. The ants forage on bird droppings and are infected by the nematodes. Some species infect the invasive ant Solenopsis invicta making them of interest in applied biological control.
