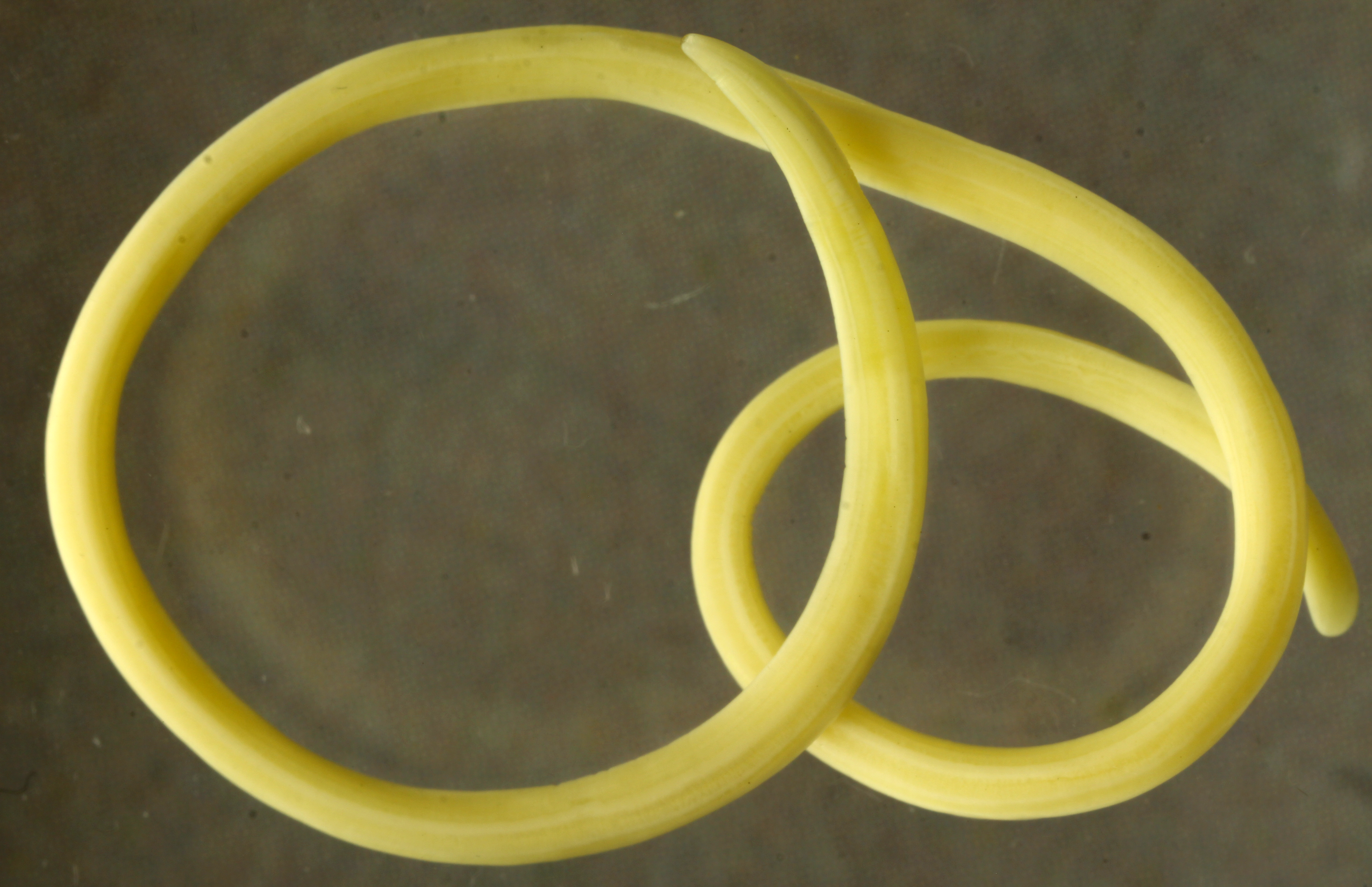
- Mermithid from Asian hornet

Scientific classification
- Kingdom: Animalia
- Phylum: Nematoda
- Class: Enoplea
- Order: Mermithida
- Family: Mermithidae; Braun, 1883

= Mermithidae =

Mermithidae Temporal range: Aptian – Recent

Family of roundworms

Mermithidae is a family of nematode worms that are endoparasites in arthropods. As early as 1877, Mermithidae was listed as one of nine subdivisions of the Nematoidea. Mermithidae are confused with the horsehair worms of the phylum Nematomorpha that have a similar life history and appearance.

Mermithids are parasites, mainly of arthropods. Most are known from insects, but some are recorded from spiders, scorpions and crustaceans. A few are known to parasitize earthworms, leeches and molluscs, and a specimen is known from a spider preserved in Baltic amber.

At least 25 species are known to parasitize mosquito larvae, making them of considerable interest in biological control. A species, probably Pheromermis vesparum, was recorded from the invasive Asian hornet (Vespa velutina) in France. The parasite was considered to be a member of the local fauna which had adapted to a new host. However, the authors concluded that the mermithid could not hamper the hornet invasion nor be used in biological control programs against this invasive species.

== Life history ==
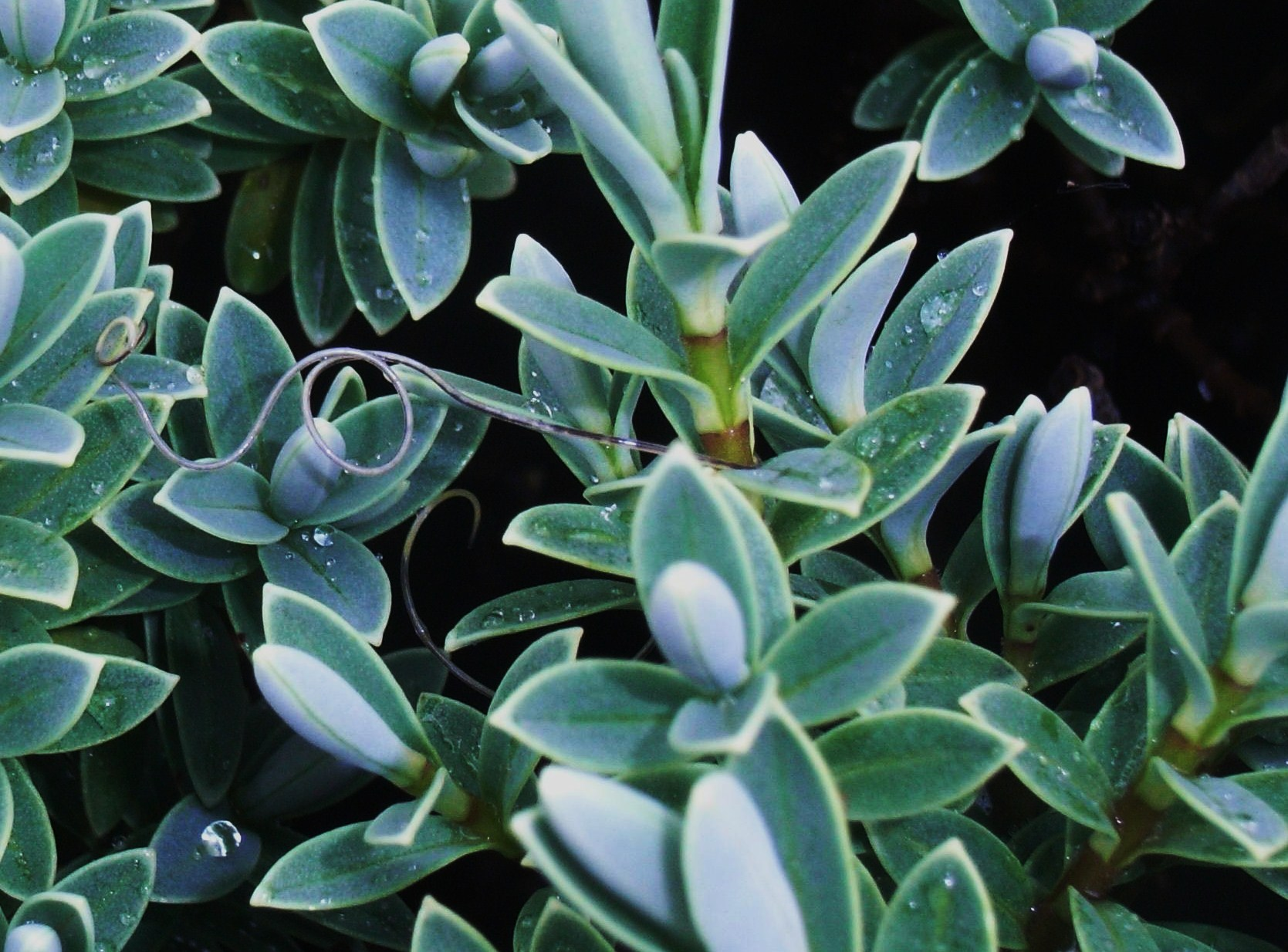
A mermithid questing for Dermaptera

Mermithids are wire-like and have a smooth cuticle with layers of spiral fibres. The digestive tract is similar to that of free-living nematodes only in the young larvae prior to their parasitic life; in the parasitic stages the oesophagus is disconnected from the mid-intestine, and females lack an anus. The female genital opening is at the midbody, while the male opening is at the tip and visible as one or two spicules. The eggs are laid either in water or on land, and the newly hatched larvae are free-living, as are the adults that emerge from the hosts to lay eggs.

The taxonomy of the group has been confused due to poor specimen collection as well as very limited morphological characteristics, and most are discovered by entomologists rather than nematologists. Even the best-studied species, Romanomermis culicivorax, has an unclear taxonomic status.

== Host behavior alteration ==
Mermithid nematodes alter their host's hemolymph osmolality (concentration of salt) to induce water-seeking behavior.

== Association with iridoviruses ==
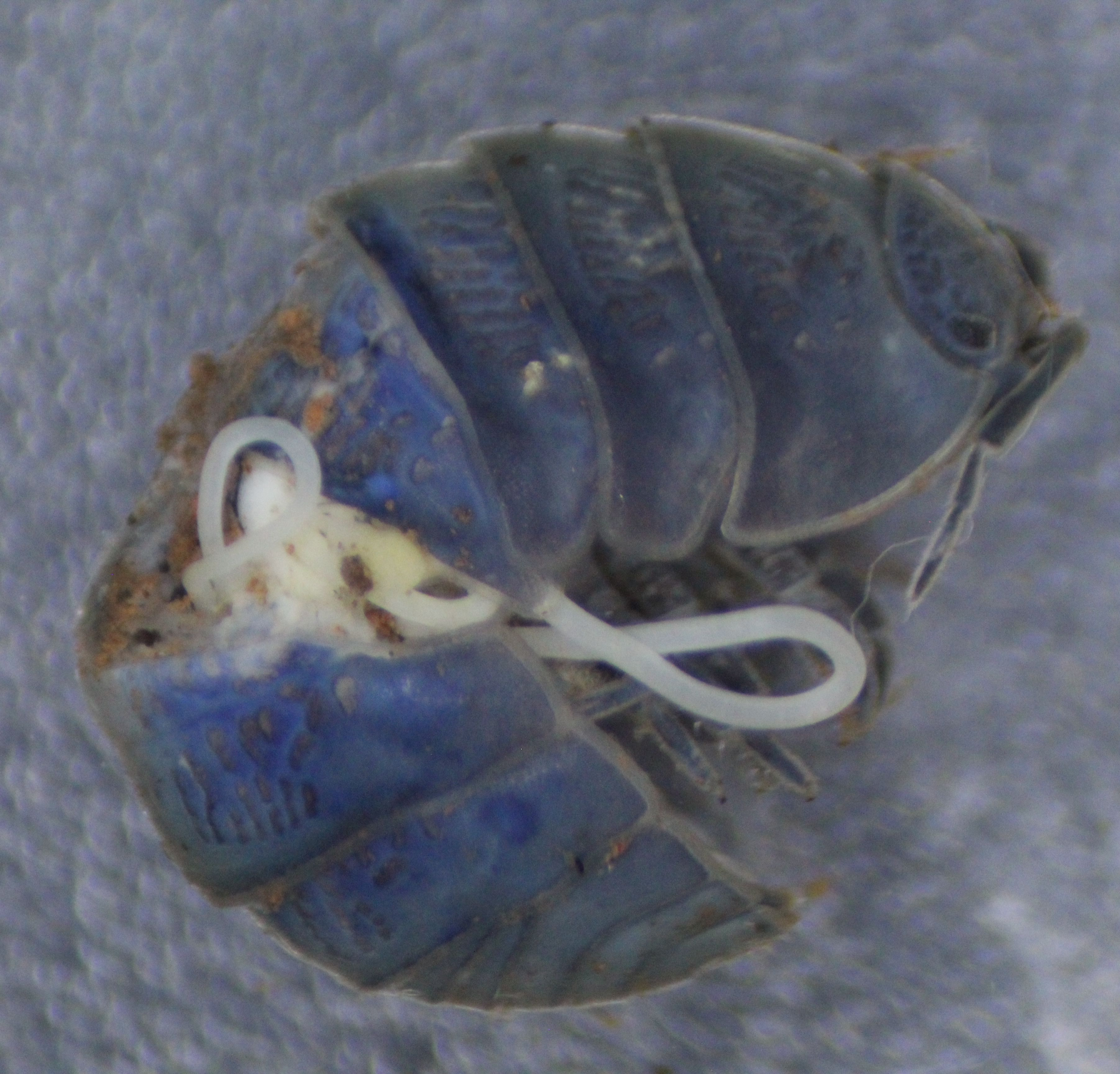
An isopod specimen infected with invertebrate iridescent virus 31 and parasitized by nematoid worms

Mermithids have been found to be associated with iridoviruses in several arthropod species. Strelkomermis spiculatus have been found to transmit an iridovirus in the mosquito species Culex pipiens, Culex apinicus, and Aedes aegypti. Isopod iridescent virus has been found associated with Thaumamermis cosgrovei in the isopod species Porcellio scaber and Armadillidium vulgare. An unidentified iridovirus virus has been found in the fly species Culicoides variipennis sonorensis in association with Heleidomermis magnapapula infections. In all three instances, iridoviral infections occurred at a much higher rate in mermithid-parasitized individuals. However, in the case of the interaction between C. v. sonorensis, H. magnapapula, and their iridovirus, the virus appears to kill both host and parasite before they reach maturity, impairing the mermithid's biological control of C. v. sonorensis.

== Included genera ==
These genera are included in the family:

- Abathymermis Rubtsov, 1871
- Aranimermis
- Bathymermis Daday, 1911
- †Cretacimermis Poinar, 2001
- Eumermis Daday, 1911
- Gastromermis Micoletzky, 1923
- †Heydenius Taylor, 1935
- Hydromermis Corti, 1902
- Lanceimermis Artyukhovskii, 1969
- Limnomermis Daday, 1911
- Mermis Dujardin, 1842
- Pheromermis Poinar, Lane & Thomas, 1976
- Quadrimermis Coman, 1961
- Reesimermis Tsai & Grundman, 1969
- Romanomermis
- Spiculimermis Artyukhovskii, 1963
- Strelkovimermis Rubzov, 1969
- Tetramermis Steiner, 1925
