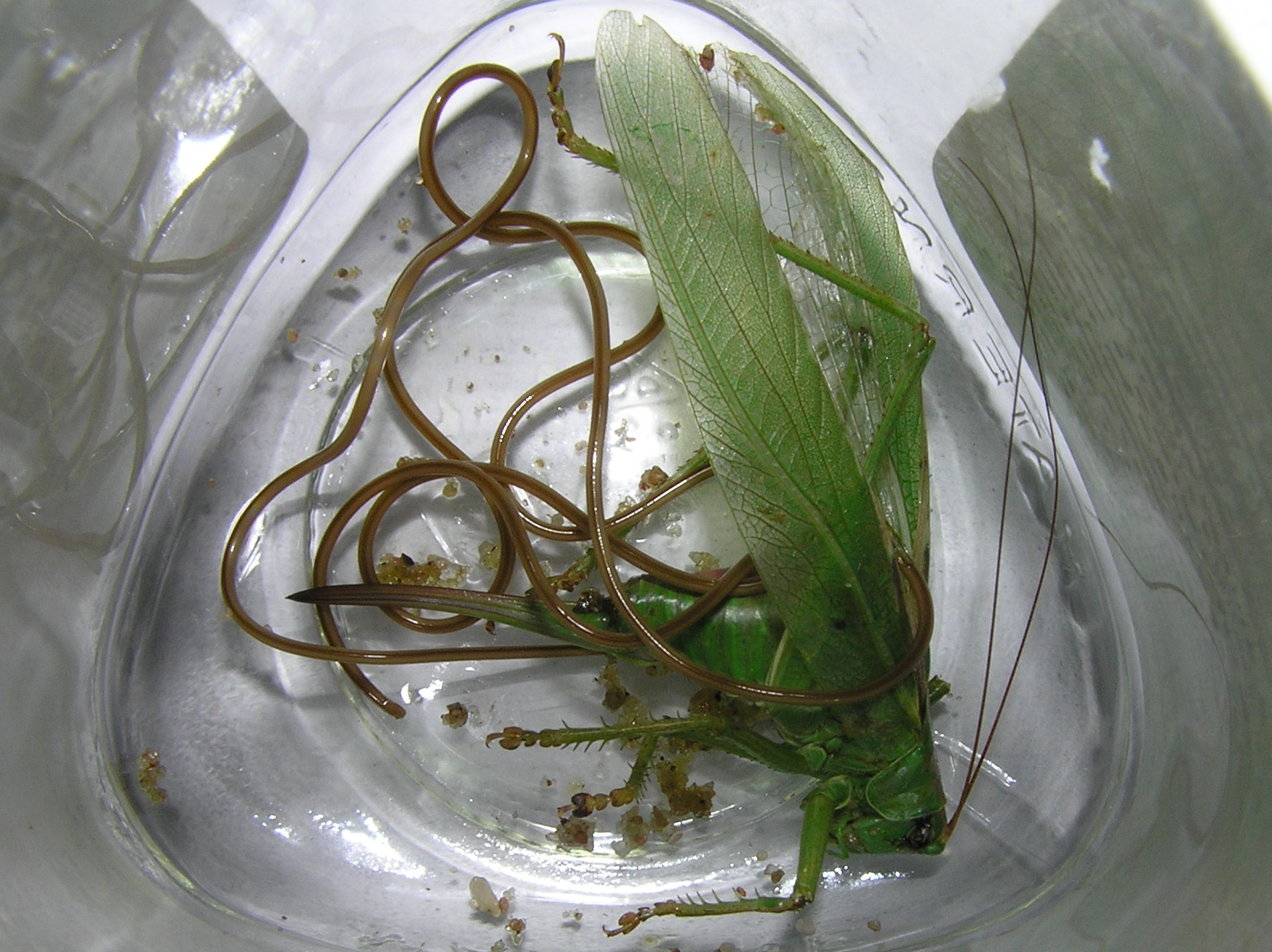
- Mermis nigrescens on Tettigonia viridissima

Scientific classification
- Domain: Eukaryota
- Kingdom: Animalia
- Phylum: Nematoda
- Class: Enoplea
- Subclass: Dorylaimia
- Order: Mermithida; Hyman, 1951

Families
- Mermithidae; Tetradonematidae

= Mermithida =

Order of roundworms

Mermithida is an order of nematode worms. The order includes two families, and most members are endoparasites on arthropods. One of the morphological characteristics of the order is the presence of a stichosome.
