= List of ants of Great Britain =

This is a list of ants of Great Britain, including endemic and introduced species. Compared with much of the rest of Europe, Great Britain has a smaller number of ants. The size and diversity of ant species in any area is largely determined by the highest summer soil temperature. As a result of this, the greatest concentration of different species is centred in the warmer parts of the country – Dorset, Hampshire, Surrey, the Isle of Wight and Kent being the 5 richest counties, with 33, 31, 29, 27 and 26 different species present respectively.

A few species, best exemplified by Lasius niger and Myrmica rubra, are truly cosmopolitan, colonising a great variety of different habitats (often including those directly resultant from human activities). These species are very common in most places, and have ranges that cover most of the nation.

The larger part of Great Britain's ant species are, however, considerably more specialised in their requirements. Most independent species are found on undisturbed heathland in the south – probably as a direct result of its superior summer soil temperatures – and six are entirely dependent on other species during their mature life (i.e. not simply to found colonies, a requirement of many further species).

Many of the lesser seen species are at the northern extent of their range in Britain, and for this reason are confined to the south. The variously differing biotopes afforded by parkland / partially wooded heath and larger traditional style gardens are also inhabited by a number of otherwise more heathland-pigeonholed species, such as Formica fusca/lemani, Lasius mixtus/umbratus and L. fuliginosus.

The remaining species are mostly sylvan. These include the well known wood ants, typified by the southerly inclined Formica rufa, and the more northerly F. lugubris and F. aquilonia. These large, noticeable species abide in mounds constructed from leaf litter, which are still a common sight in many older forests and broken woodland up and down the country. A few other smaller, less easily spotted species also make their livings in conjunction with more wooded areas. Stenamma species, Leptothorax acervorum and Temnothorax nylanderi can be found, locality permitting, under stones/logs and beneath loose bark respectively, in established woods. The former habitat is also shared by the rather locally distributed Ponera coarctata, one of two unambiguously native British representatives of the subfamily Ponerinae. The other is the recently discovered P. testacea, which inhabits xerothermic sites.

The list largely follows Skinner & Allen's Naturalists' Handbooks 24 : Ants published in 1996, though there have been some additions and corrections. Introduced species are marked with an asterisk (*).

== Dolichoderinae ==
Waist with a single segment called the petiole. Gaster with four segments visible from above in females (workers and queens). Sting absent. Anal aperture flattened with a hairless horizontal slit.

- Linepithema humile, Argentine ant *
- Tapinoma erraticum, erratic ant – A small black ant found in southern Britain nesting in heathland. Notable for its solaria.
- Tapinoma subboreale – A small black ant found in southern Britain nesting in heathland. Previously known as Tapinoma ambiguum and then briefly as Tapinoma madeirense.
- Tapinoma melanocephalum *

== Formicinae ==
Waist with a single segment called the petiole. Gaster with five segments visible from above in females (workers and queens). Sting absent. Anal aperture pointed and fringed with hairs.

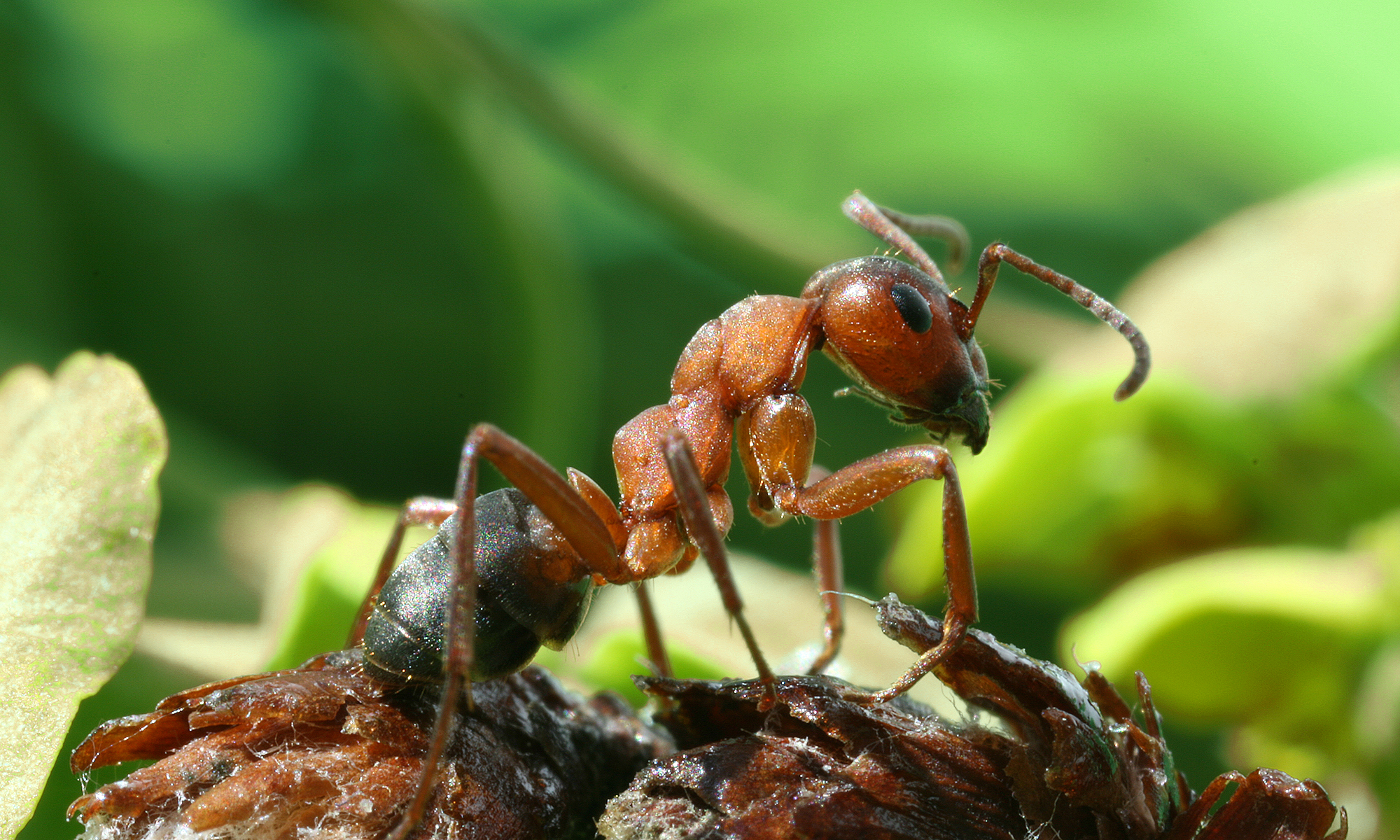
Southern wood ant (Formica rufa)

- Camponotus sp., carpenter ants *
- Formica aquilonia, northern wood ant – A wood ant building tall, conical, thatched mound nests. Found in the highlands of Scotland with a few records from Ireland. Not found in England.
- Formica cunicularia – A large ant often with some reddish parts quite common in parts of southern England. Nests in small earth mounds.
- Formica exsecta – A large ant with a deeply excised head found in Devon and highlands of Scotland. Nests in small thatched mounds.
- Formica fusca – A large black ant common in southern Britain.
- Formica lemani – Very similar to F. fusca, but hairier and found in more northerly and westerly areas.
- Formica lugubris, hairy wood ant – Very similar to F. rufa but with a more northerly distribution. Much more tolerant of shade than F. rufa or F. aquilonia, so often found in denser, commercial forests.
- Formica picea, black bog ant – Rare shiny black ant. Nests in tussocks in marshy ground in the New Forest, Dorset and in Glamorganshire, South Wales. Formerly known as Formica candida and before that as Formica transkaucasica.
- Formica pratensis – A wood ant probably now extinct in England. Last seen in Dorset in the late 1980s. Still found on the Channel Islands in Jersey and Guernsey.
- Formica rufa, red or southern wood ant – A large ant. It builds large thatched mounds in open woodland.
- Formica rufibarbis – A large rare ant found in a small number of sites in southern England and the Scilly Isles. Looks similar to F. cunicularia.
- Formica sanguinea, blood-red slave-maker ant – Redder than the other Formica species. Faculative dulote. It makes slaves of other formicine species, most usually of Formica fusca.
- Lasius alienus – A small black ant found in chalky grassland.
- Lasius brunneus, brown tree ant – A small fugitive bi-coloured ant nesting in trees, especially old oak trees. Found in woods and parkland.
- Lasius emarginatus – A small bi-coloured continental species previously found in the Channel Isles but not the mainland. A colony was discovered in London in 2008.
- Lasius flavus, yellow meadow ant – A very common yellow ant. It builds large earthen mounds that last many years in undisturbed grassland. It can also be found nesting under stones and in garden lawns. It lives mostly underground and is not often seen on the surface.
- Lasius fuliginosus, jet black ant – Large shiny black ant with heart shaped head. It nests in tree stumps and hedgerows and has a patchy distribution. Fertilised queens start colonies through adoption by L. mixtus and L. umbratus.
- Lasius meridionalis – A yellow subterranean ant found in lowland sandy heaths. Fertilised queens start colonies through adoption by Lasius alienus.
- Lasius mixtus – A yellow subterranean ant nesting deep in the ground among shrub roots and under deep boulders, but occasionally also constructs mounds of fine loose soil. Fertilised queens start colonies through adoption by Lasius alienus, L. niger or L. brunneus nests.
- Lasius neglectus * invasive garden ant – A small brown ant that forms super colonies in parks and gardens. First found in Gloucestershire in 2009. Likely to spread.
- Lasius niger, black garden ant – Common in towns nesting under paving stones and in gardens, it also constructs mounds of loose soil in fields.
- Lasius platythorax – Looks very similar to Lasius niger from which it was recently split but nests in cooler damper places. Does not work the earth but typically nests in dead wood.
- Lasius psammophilus – Very similar to Lasius alienus from which it was recently split. Found in sandy areas.
- Lasius sabularum – A yellow subterranean ant.
- Lasius umbratus – A yellow subterranean ant nesting under boulders, in tree stumps and at the base of old trees. Fertilised queens start colonies through adoption by Lasius alienus, L. niger or L. brunneus nests.
- Paratrechina vividula *
- Paratrechina longicornis *

== Myrmicinae ==
Waist with two segments, the petiole and post-petiole. Stings usually present in female castes.

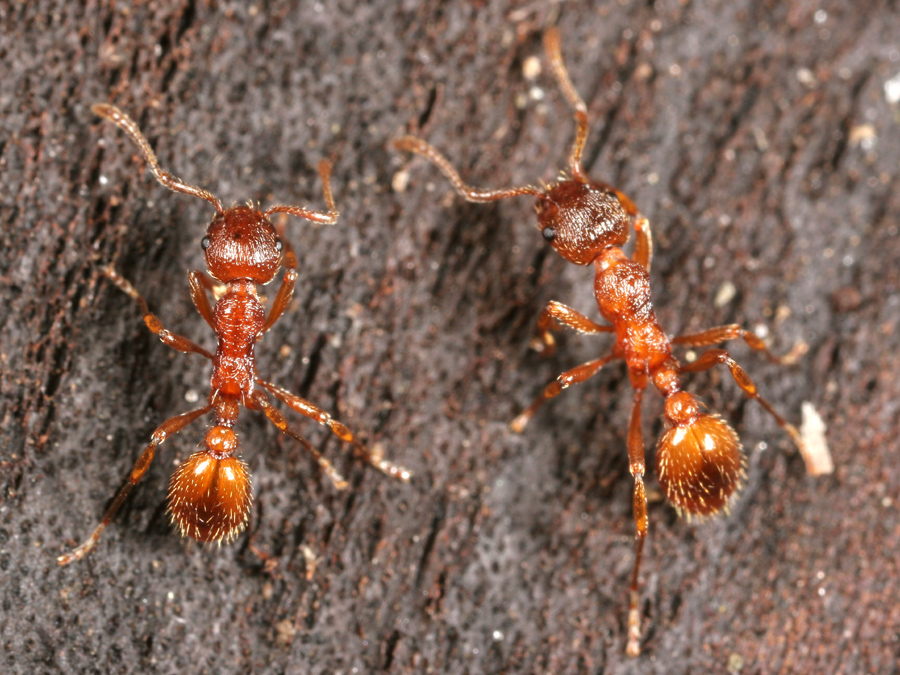
Myrmica rubra

- Anergates atratulus – Previous name of Tetramorium atratulum.
- Crematogaster scutellaris * a southern european species that nests in trees, may be imported with cork and has recently been discovered in some buildings.
- Formicoxenus nitidulus – A guest ant. It nests in colonies of the much larger Formica rufa.
- Leptothorax acervorum – A small ant nesting in tree stumps, under stones and in peat.
- Monomorium pharaonis, pharaoh ant *
- Monomorium salomonis *
- Myrmecina graminicola, woodlouse ant – So called because it tends to roll into a ball when disturbed. A dark and slow moving ant. Local.
- Myrmica hirsuta – A rare almost workerless parasite of Myrmica sabuleti.
- Myrmica karavajevi – A workerless parasite of Myrmica sabuleti and M. scabrinodis.
- Myrmica lonae – A rare red ant recorded from Scotland nesting in soil and under stones.
- Myrmica lobicornis – Not common. It is found on lowland heath and open woodland.
- Myrmica rubra, red ant – A common lowland species most abundant in alluvial soils near rivers.
- Myrmica ruginodis, red ant – A common species abundant in woodland where it nests in tree stumps.
- Myrmica sabuleti – A red ant, locally common nesting in sun exposed sheltered sites.
- Myrmica scabrinodis, elbowed red ant – A common red ant with variable habits. Often found associated with the meadow ant Lasius flavus, but also common in woodland, coastal areas, riverbanks and moorland.
- Myrmica schencki – This nocturnal red ant is not common.
- Myrmica specioides – A rather local red ant. Nests occur in coastal sand, gravel banks and post industrial sites. Sometimes referred to as Myrmica bessarabica.
- Myrmica sulcinodis – A dark red ant characteristic of well-drained heather moorland.
- Myrmica vandeli – A rare red ant found in warm boggy areas.
- Pheidole megacephala *
- Solenopsis fugax thief ant – It has very small yellow workers and nests deep in the ground. It is often associated with Lasius flavus or Formica species, from which it steals.
- Stenamma debile – A small and easily overlooked species nesting in woods under stones and in found leaf litter. More common than Stenamma westwoodii with which it has until recently been confused.
- Stenamma westwoodii – A small and easily overlooked species less common than Stenamma debile with which it has, until recently, been confused.
- Strongylognathus testaceus – obligate dulote found only with Tetramorium
- Temnothorax albipennis – A small ant found in warm coastal areas nesting in cracks in rocks.
- Temnothorax interruptus – A small uncommon ant
- Temnothorax nylanderi – A small ant found in leaf litter in woods.
- Tetramorium atratulum – Previously known as Anergates atratulus, This ant is an obligate workerless parasite found in nests of Tetramorium caespitum.
- Tetramorium caespitum – Tends to be coastal and forms large colonies.

== Ponerinae ==
The petiole is a thickened node and there is often a constriction between the first and second gastral segments. Workers and queens have functional stings.

Ponera coarctata male

- Hypoponera punctatissima * – A cosmopolitan species occasionally recorded away from buildings.
- Hypoponera ergatandria * – Previously named Hypoponera schauinslandi. A cosmopolitan species rarely recorded away from buildings.
- Ponera coarctata – A primitive ant forming small colonies beneath stones. Found in warm places.
- Ponera testacea – Previously regarded as a variety of P. coarctata, this mainly mediterranean species is scarce further north in Europe, living under stones in open xerothermic sites. Identified and published from a single locality in coastal South East England in 2010, it is now (2016) recorded from a scatter of coastal sites from Cornwall to Suffolk.

== See also ==
- List of ant genera (alphabetical)
- List of Hymenoptera of Ireland
