= Batrisus formicarius =

Scientific classification
- Kingdom: Animalia
- Phylum: Arthropoda
- Clade: Pancrustacea
- Class: Insecta
- Order: Coleoptera
- Suborder: Polyphaga
- Infraorder: Staphyliniformia
- Family: Staphylinidae
- Genus: Batrisus
- Species: B. formicarius

Binomial name
- Batrisus formicarius (Aubé, 1833)

Species of beetle

Batrisus formicarius is a European species of ant-loving beetle placed within the Pselaphinae subfamily of the Staphylinidae family.

== Biology and distribution ==
Batrisus formicarius is a myrmecophile: it lives in association with ants, being found inside nests of the ant Lasius brunneus as well as, occasionally, Lasius emarginatus. The small, ant-sized beetle acts as a commensal organism, feeding on the mites which are often found inhabiting the ants' nests. As such, it is not only tolerated but also cared for by the ants. Similar relationships are found in other related beetles such as Batrisodes, however these are only more or less facultative myrmecophiles, as opposed to the exclusively myrmecophilic Batrisus like B. formicarius, which only live inside ant nests. The main host of B. formicarius, Lasius brunneus, is a widespread European species found from Iberia to the Caucasus and from Scandinavia to Turkey. It mostly inhabits forested areas where it nests in rotting logs and under bark. The beetle species likely shares the same habitat preferences and much of its range, except for Northern Europe, Anatolia and the Caucasus. It is considered to be a Southern and Central European species, having been found in Spain, France, Italy, Switzerland, Luxembourg, the Netherlands, Germany, the Czech Republic, Slovakia, Austria, Hungary, Slovenia, Bosnia, Serbia, Montenegro, North Macedonia, Greece, Bulgaria, Poland, Ukraine and Russia.

== Diagnosis ==
Batrisus formicarius is one of the only two species of the Batrisus genus to be known from Europe alongside Batrisus ormayi, a species known from the Carpathian mountains of Transylvania, Romania. The Batrisus genus can be separated from other European pselaphine beetles by the shape of the maxillary palps (a pair of small appendages placed close to the mouth), which are wider at the front, lack of spines on the pronotum and presence of only shallow to no furrows at the sides of the last segments of the abdomen. Batrrisus formicarius and Batrisus ormayi can be differentiated through several external characteristics:

1. The antennae of Batrisus formicarius are more slender than those of Batrisus ormayi (which has very thick antennae), especially in the central and lower segments. As a result, the last 3 segments appear to be more enlarged when compared to the rest. The central segments are only slightly wider than long, as opposed to Batrisus ormayi in which they are much wider.
2. The whole body surface of Batrisus ormayi is covered in a much more dense pubescence, giving it a more matt appearance than Batrisus formicarius, which is mostly shiny. Furthermore, the elytra of Batrisus ormayi specimens have longer hairs than those of Batrisus formicarius.
3. The two species are thought to live alongside different ant species. As previously mentioned, Batrisus formicarius is mostly found in Lasius brunneus nests, with Lasius emarginatus being a rare secondary host. Batrisus ormayi, on the other hand, has been collected in the nests of Lasius flavus.

A third species, Batrisus sibiricus, has been collected in Siberia. While its range may include parts of Europe, this is considered to be quite unlikely. Regardless, it can be easily differentiated from the other two by the presence of a pair of small spines behind the eyes. it also has longitudinal notches spanning across the whole length of the first exposed segment of the abdomen, rather than only halfway
