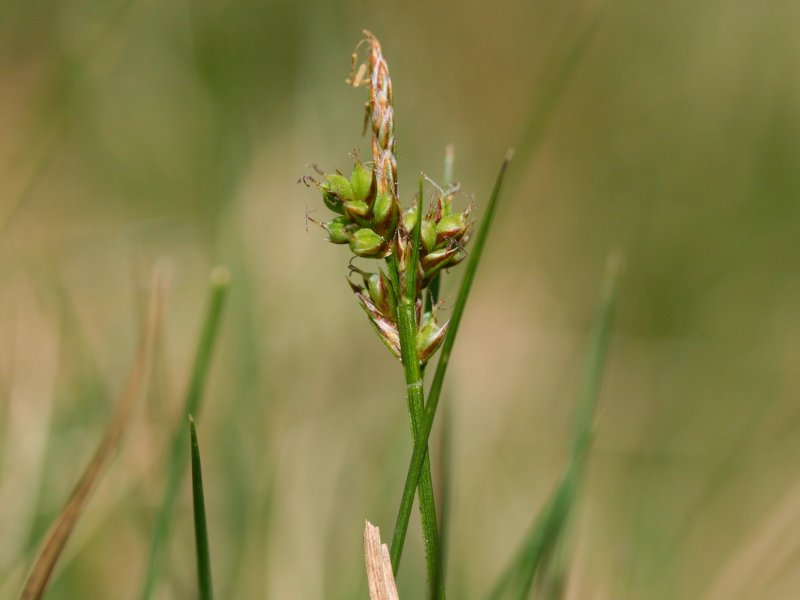

Scientific classification
- Kingdom: Plantae
- Clade: Tracheophytes
- Clade: Angiosperms
- Clade: Monocots
- Clade: Commelinids
- Order: Poales
- Family: Cyperaceae
- Genus: Carex
- Subgenus: Carex subg. Carex
- Section: Carex sect. Acrocystis
- Species: C. pilulifera

Binomial name
- Carex pilulifera L.

Synonyms
- Bitteria pilulifera (L.) Fedde & J.Schust.; Trasus pilulifer (L.) Gray

= Carex pilulifera =

Species of grass-like plant

Carex pilulifera, the pill sedge, is a European species of sedge found in acid heaths, woods, and grassland from Macaronesia to Scandinavia. It grows up to 30 cm (12 in) tall, with 2–4 female spikes and 1 male spike in an inflorescence. These stalks bend as the seeds ripen, and the seeds are collected and dispersed by ants of the species Myrmica ruginodis.

== Description ==
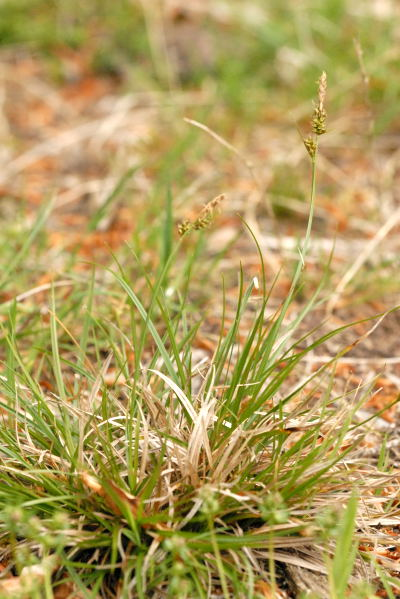
Habitus

The culms of Carex pilulifera grow to a length of 8–30 centimetres (3–12 in), and are often noticeably curved. The leaves are 5–20 cm (2–8 in) long and 1.5–2.0 millimetres (0.06–0.08 in) wide, and are fairly flat. The rhizomes of C. pilulifera are very short, giving the plant a caespitose (densely tufted) appearance. The tussock grows outwards through the production of annual side-shoots.

The inflorescence comprises a single, terminal, male (staminate) spike, and 2–4 lateral female (pistillate) spikes. The spikes are clustered together, and the whole inflorescence is 1–4 cm (0.4–1.6 in) long. The female spikes are 4–8 mm (0.16–0.31 in) long, ovoid or approaching spherical, and contain 5–15 flowers. The female spikes are directly attached to the stem, where each is subtended by a bract that does not form a sheath. The male spike is 8–15 mm (0.3–0.6 in) long and much narrower.

== Distribution and ecology ==
Carex pilulifera has a wide distribution in Europe, extending from Macaronesia (Azores and Madeira) and the northern Balkan Peninsula to Scandinavia and northern European Russia. It grows on acidic substrates including heathland, grassland , and woodland. It typically inhabits soils with a pH of 4.5–6.0.

As the seeds of C. pilulifera ripen, the culms bend and can eventually touch the ground. The seeds are then dispersed by ants, particularly Myrmica ruginodis, in a process known as myrmecochory, and are eaten by other insects, such as the ground beetle Harpalus fuliginosus.

== Subspecies ==
Two subspecies are accepted.

- Carex pilulifera subsp. azorica (J.Gay) Franco & Rocha Afonso (synonym Carex azorica J.Gay) – Azores
- Carex pilulifera subsp. pilulifera (synonyms Carex aederi Desv., Carex alba Bastard, Carex bastardiana DC., Carex decumbens Ehrh., Carex pullulans Dulac, and Carex saxumbra F.Lees) – Europe and Madeira

== Taxonomic history ==
Carex pilulifera was first described by Carl Linnaeus in his 1753 work Species Plantarum, which marks the starting point of botanical nomenclature. The specific epithet pilulifera means "bearing small globular structures", in reference to the female spikes.
