= Matabele ant =

Matabele ant refers to one of the following ant species or groups:

- Certain Afrotropical Dorylus species, also known as Driver ants
- Megaponera analis, a ponerine ant species

== See also ==
- Plectroctena spp., resemble M. analis but are not army ants
