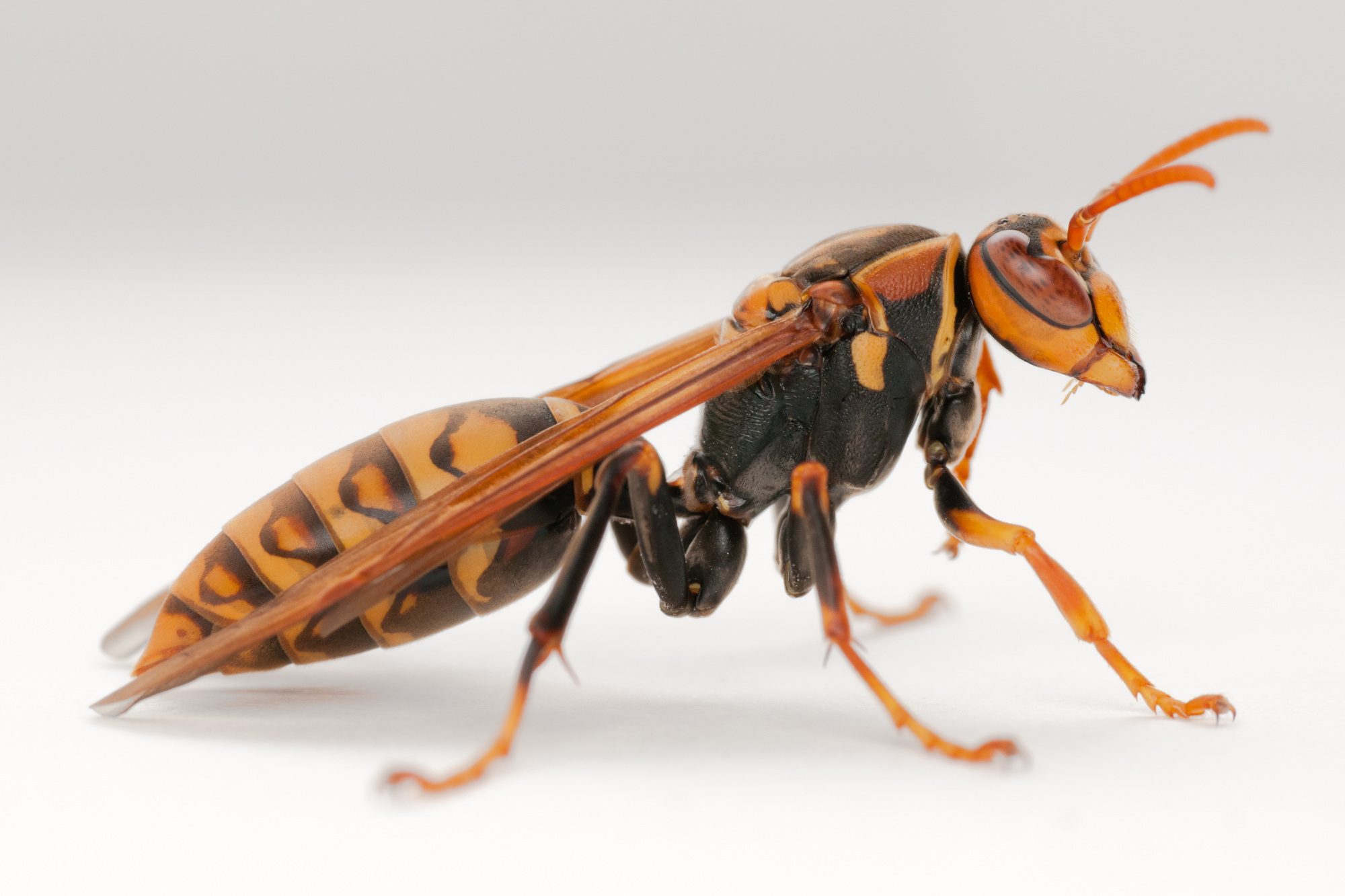

Scientific classification
- Kingdom: Animalia
- Phylum: Arthropoda
- Clade: Pancrustacea
- Class: Insecta
- Order: Hymenoptera
- Family: Vespidae
- Genus: Polistes
- Species: P. jokahamae

Binomial name
- Polistes jokahamae Radoszkowski, 1887

Synonyms
- Polistes jadwigae Dalla Torre, 1904

= Polistes jokahamae =

Species of wasp

The dark-waisted paper wasp, (Polistes jokahamae) is a species of primitively eusocial paper wasp from Southeast Asia.

== Distribution ==
The dark-waisted paper wasp is found in Japan (excepting the island of Hokkaido), China, India, and Vietnam.

== Colony formation ==
Queens emerge from diapause in late March. New nests are founded from mid-April to early May. Nests most often have a single founding queen; multiple foundresses are found in less than 1% of P. jokahamae colonies. Like other Polistes wasps, the dark-waisted paper wasp constructs nests of chewed plant fibers mixed with proteinaceous oral secretions.

Nests consist of multiple cells in which the queen lays her eggs. The cells are then capped with a silky material produced by the queen and the larvae develop inside. The first brood are fed and cared for by the queen. Two larvae are raised in each cell in the first brood (presumably to conserve resources) and the workers emerge smaller than those from later broods.

The first worker emerge in the summer, followed by a second brood which includes gynes (potential future queens) and a third brood which includes males. Rarely, males may be produced earlier in the colonies' lifecycle. The development of immature wasps into gynes is triggered by exposure to shorter periods of daylight.

Mature and socially dominant workers produce eggs in established colonies; these may be eaten by the queen or by other workers. Some eggs laid by the queen are also consumed by workers. Seemingly healthy larvae of both sexes may also be terminated by workers later in the colonies' lifecycle should the queen disappear.

Males and gynes mate in autumn. The pregnant wasps spend the winter hibernating in tree trunks or other shelters and emerge in the spring to found their own colonies.

Several Polistes wasps, including the dark-waisted paper wasp, have been observed taking over orphaned or abandoned nests, sometimes abandoning their own nests to do so.

== Social behavior ==
The dark-waisted paper wasp is primitively eusocial; individuals live in colonies in which only certain members breed and care for the brood collectively, however there are no morphological differences between the breeding queens and the non-breeding workers.

Workers express dominance by biting and chasing one another. Older workers are dominant over younger workers. While queens in primitively eusocial insects generally maintain reproductive dominance through aggression, dark-waisted paper wasp queens are not the most dominant members of the colony; in fact they are often the target of aggressive behavior from workers. Queens appear to communicate their status through vibratory signals.

== Ecology ==
The dark-waisted paper wasp feeds primarily on caterpillars, including those of swallowtail butterflies and spongy moths. The prey is chewed up and rolled into balls of tissue which are transported back to nest.

P. jokahamae larvae, and less commonly adults, are preyed upon by hornets. Workers have also been observed cannibalizing conspecifics (presumably from different colonies).

The dark-waisted paper wasp is parasitized by the moth Hyposopygia postflava. Female moths lay the eggs in wasp nests and the emerging young feed on the wasp pupae and larvae.
