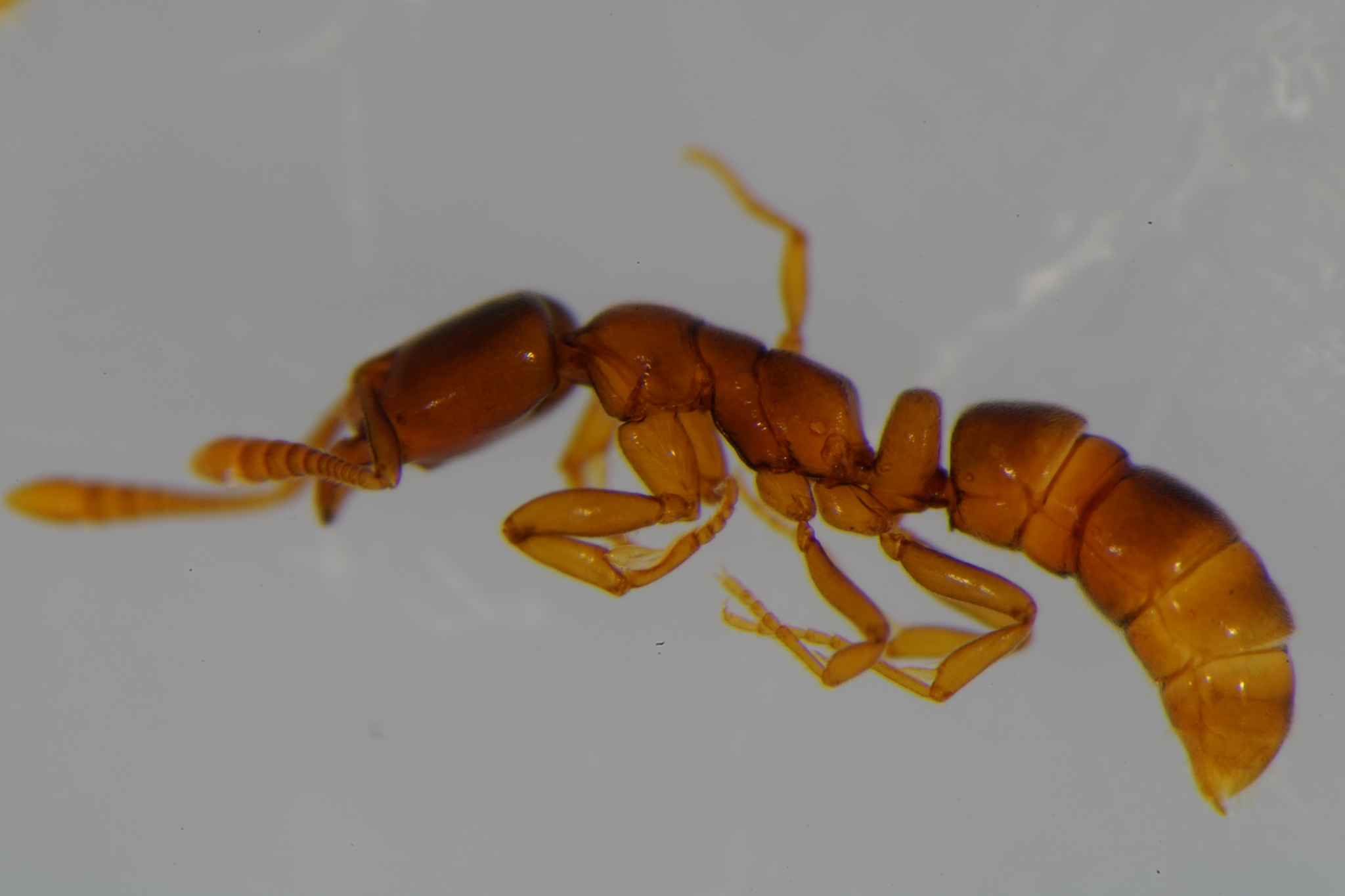

Scientific classification
- Kingdom: Animalia
- Phylum: Arthropoda
- Clade: Pancrustacea
- Class: Insecta
- Order: Hymenoptera
- Family: Formicidae
- Genus: Ponera
- Species: P. testacea

Binomial name
- Ponera testacea (Emery, 1895)

= Ponera testacea =

Species of ant

Ponera testacea is a species of ant native to Europe and some areas of the north African coast. The species was previously regarded as a variety of Ponera coarctata, being raised to species status in 2003. It is 1 of 7 species of Ponera known in the Palearctic region and 1 of 3 in Europe.

== Taxonomy ==
Ponera testacea was designated as its own species in 2003, originally considered a variant of Ponera coarctata. The two species were separated due to petiolar and habitual differences. P. testacea is more xerothermic and prefers warmer and drier habitats, whereas P. coarctata prefers more shaded areas.

In 2006 Ponera coarctata var. crassisquama was synonymised with Ponera testacea as a senior synonym.

In 2022, P. coarctata var. lucida in Turkey was proposed as a synonym to Ponera testacea. This was due to the variant initially being taxonomized as a variant of P. coarctata due to similar colouration (which is not the normal morphometric approach) despite having more similar physical anatomy to P. testacea.

== Description ==
P. testacea is very similar to P. coarctata, with the primary identifying difference being the size and shape of the petiole. In P. testacea the petiole is shorter and thicker when seen in profile, typically not extending above the height of the gaster and thorax. The sides of the petiole are also parallel sided, instead of slightly tapering as seen in its sister species. P. testcea is also smaller than its sister species on average, and are typically of a lighter colouration than P. coarctata.

Workers were measured at 2.5-3.0mm in length with thick decumbent hairs cover the full body. Female alates were measured at 3.0mm on average in length, sharing the thick decumbent hairs of the workers.

== Distribution and habitat ==
P. testacea is distributed across most of Europe, excluding Scandinavia, the Baltics, Belarus, Ireland and Iceland. Its range extends east to the Caucus region and Southern Russia. The specie's most eastern presence is located in Turkmenistan, and its most southern records are from Tunisia and Morocco.

Unlike its sister species, P. testacea prefers a more xerothermic (warmer and drier) habitat, avoiding humid and/or shaded sites which P. coarctata would prefer.

== Biology ==
P. testacea is said to have similar behaviour to its sister species P. coarctata, with colonies comprising up to 40 workers, and nests consisting of simple passageways running through soil with one or two small chambers.

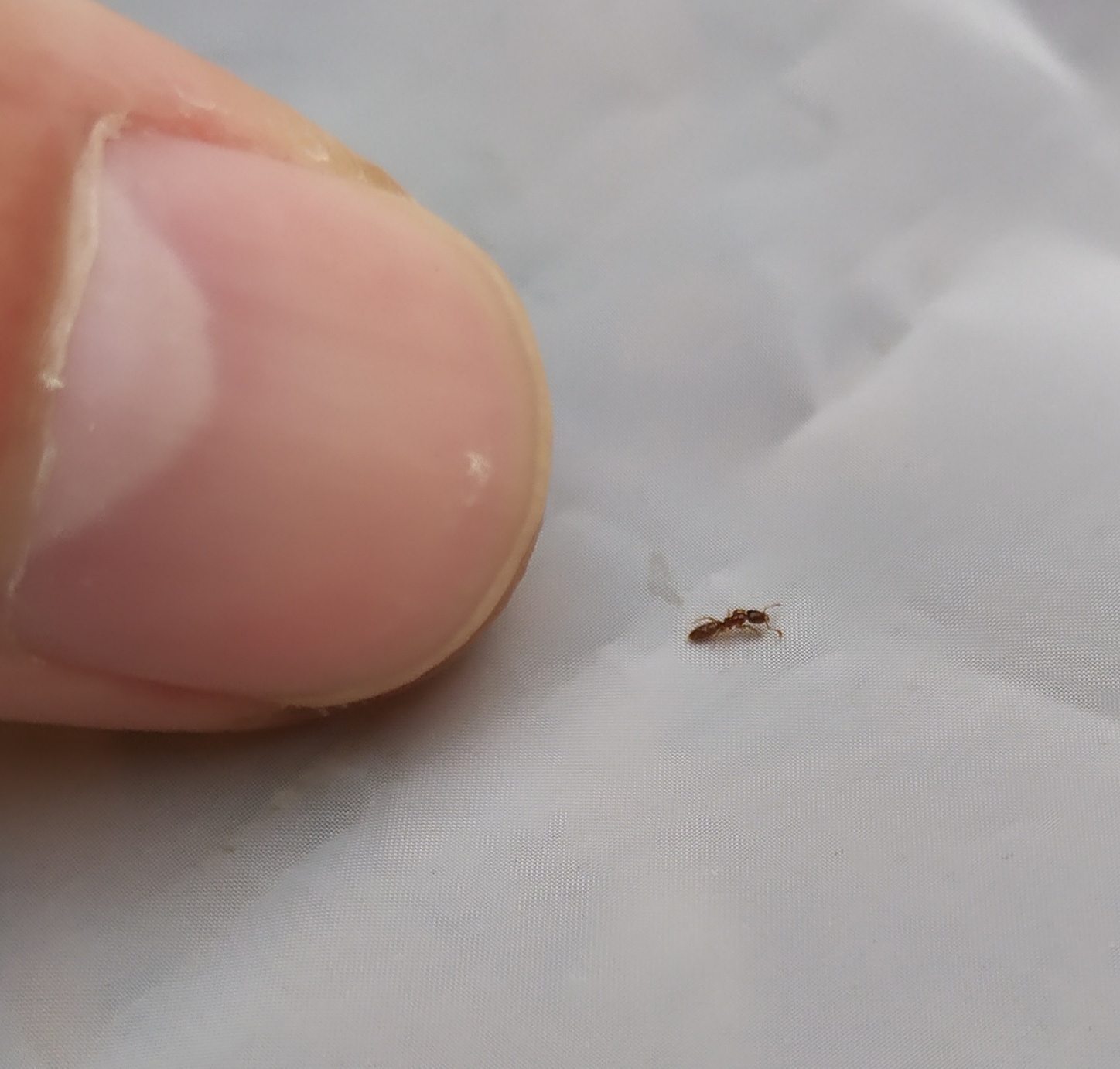
P. testacea next to a human thumb

Its diet (similar to all ponerines) likely consists of developmental stages of ground-dwelling invertebrates. Workers are known to forage solitarily in soil, litter and moss.

== See also ==
- List of ants of Great Britain
