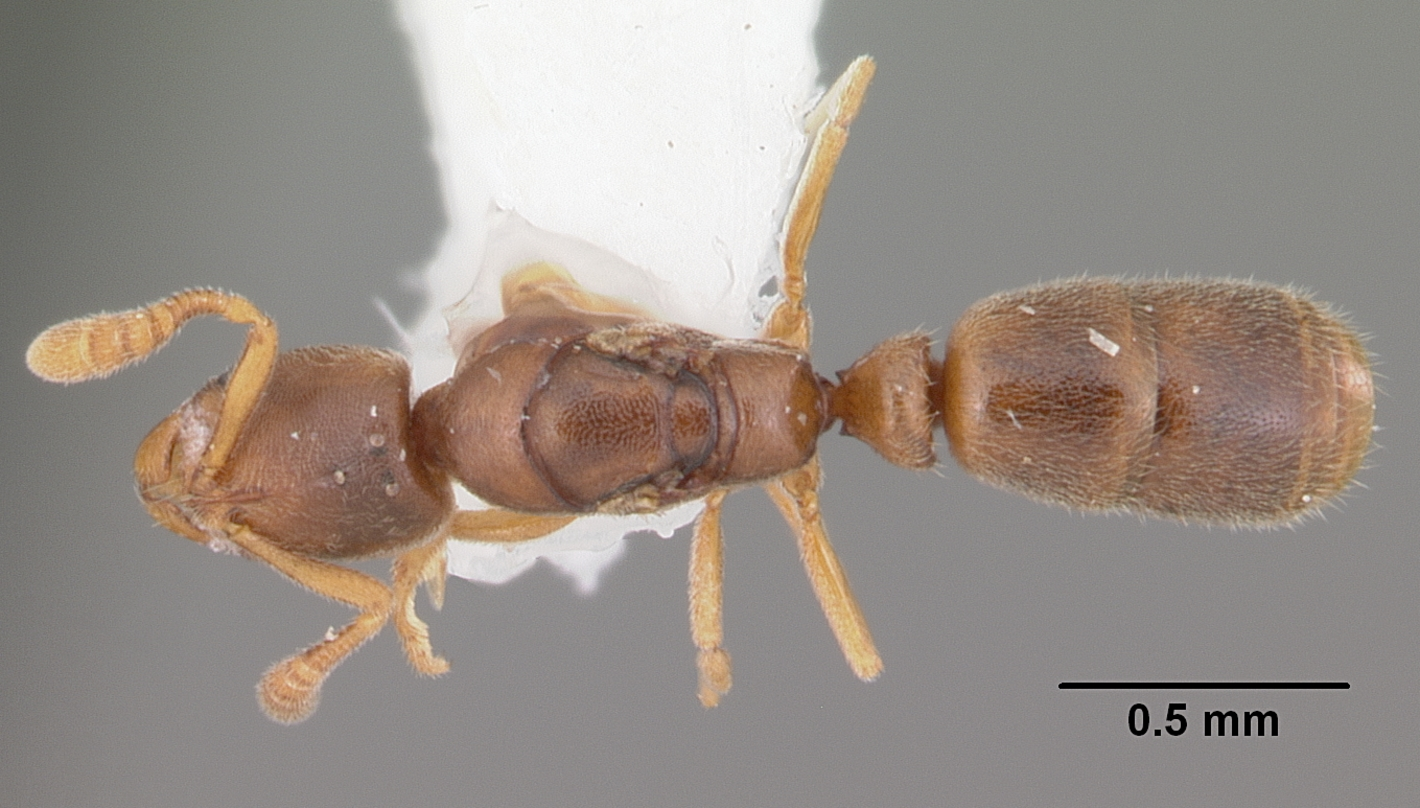

Scientific classification
- Domain: Eukaryota
- Kingdom: Animalia
- Phylum: Arthropoda
- Class: Insecta
- Order: Hymenoptera
- Family: Formicidae
- Tribe: Ponerini
- Genus: Ponera
- Species: P. exotica

Binomial name
- Ponera exotica Smith, 1962

= Ponera exotica =

Species of ant

Ponera exotica is a species of ant in the family Formicidae.

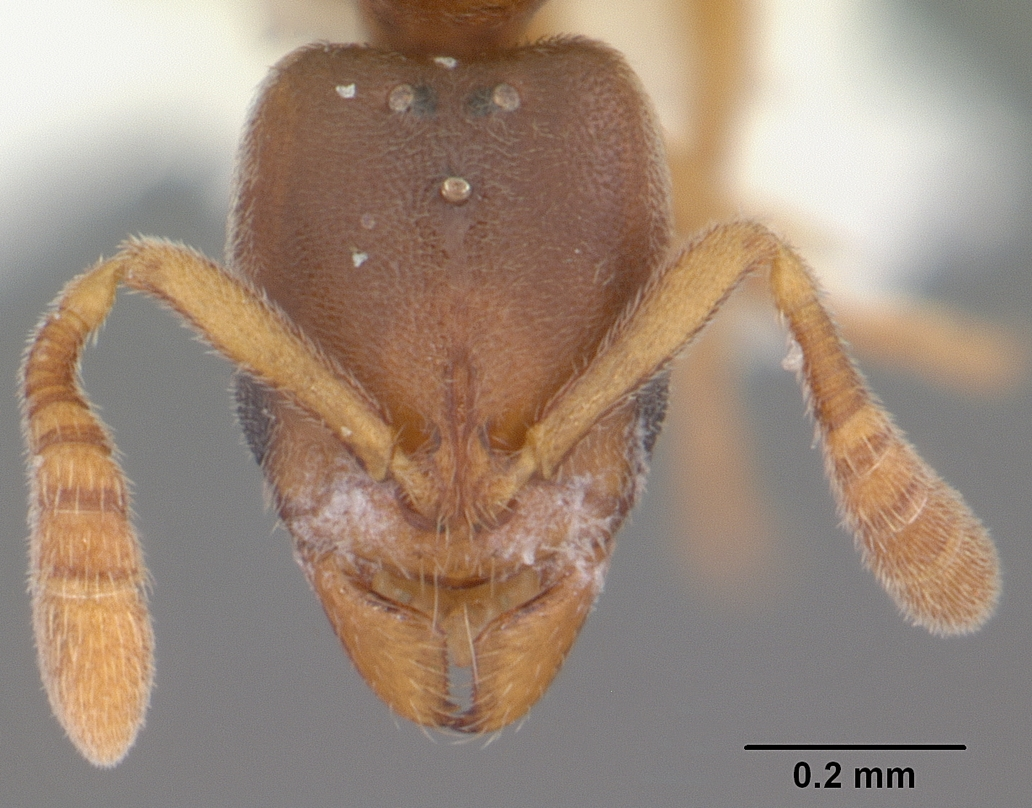

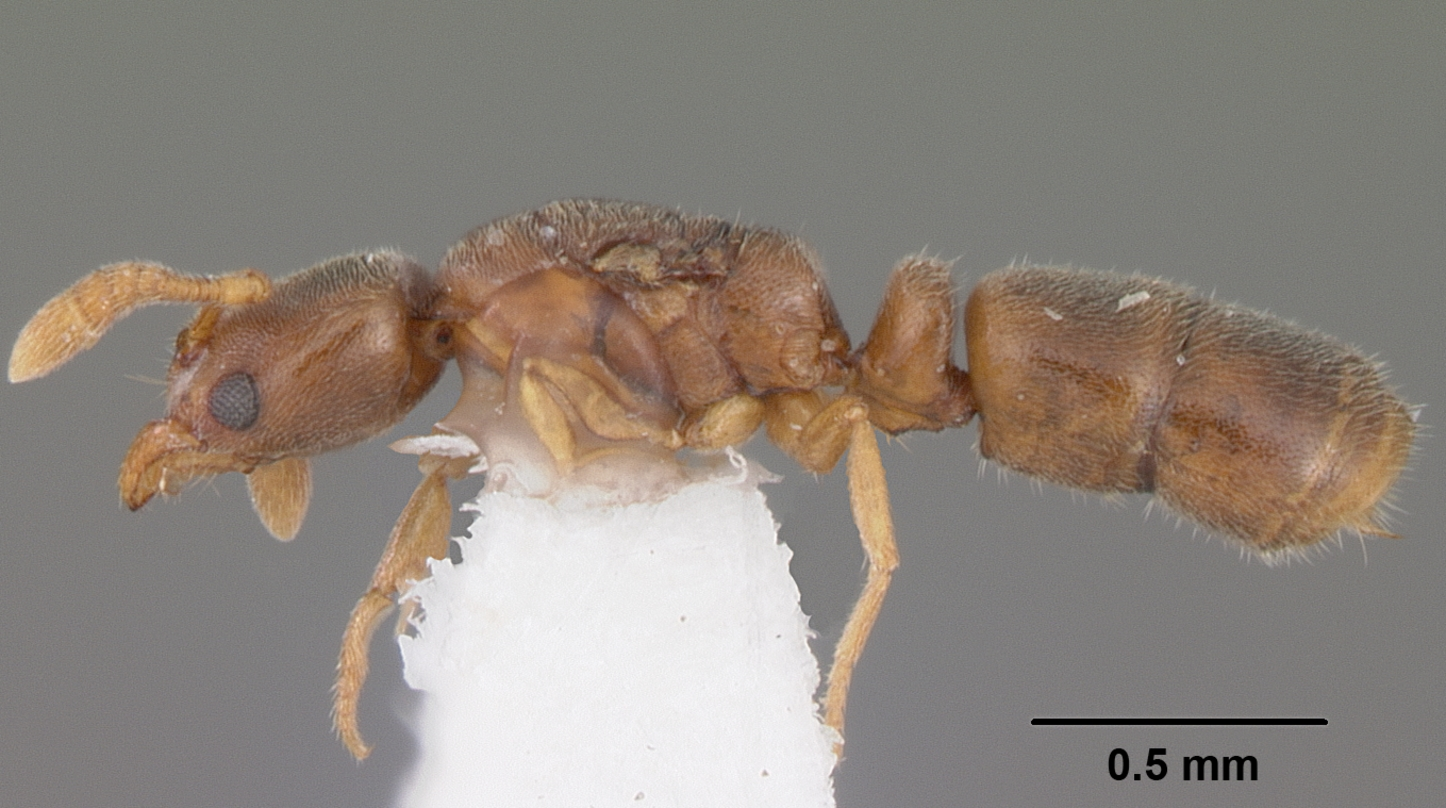
