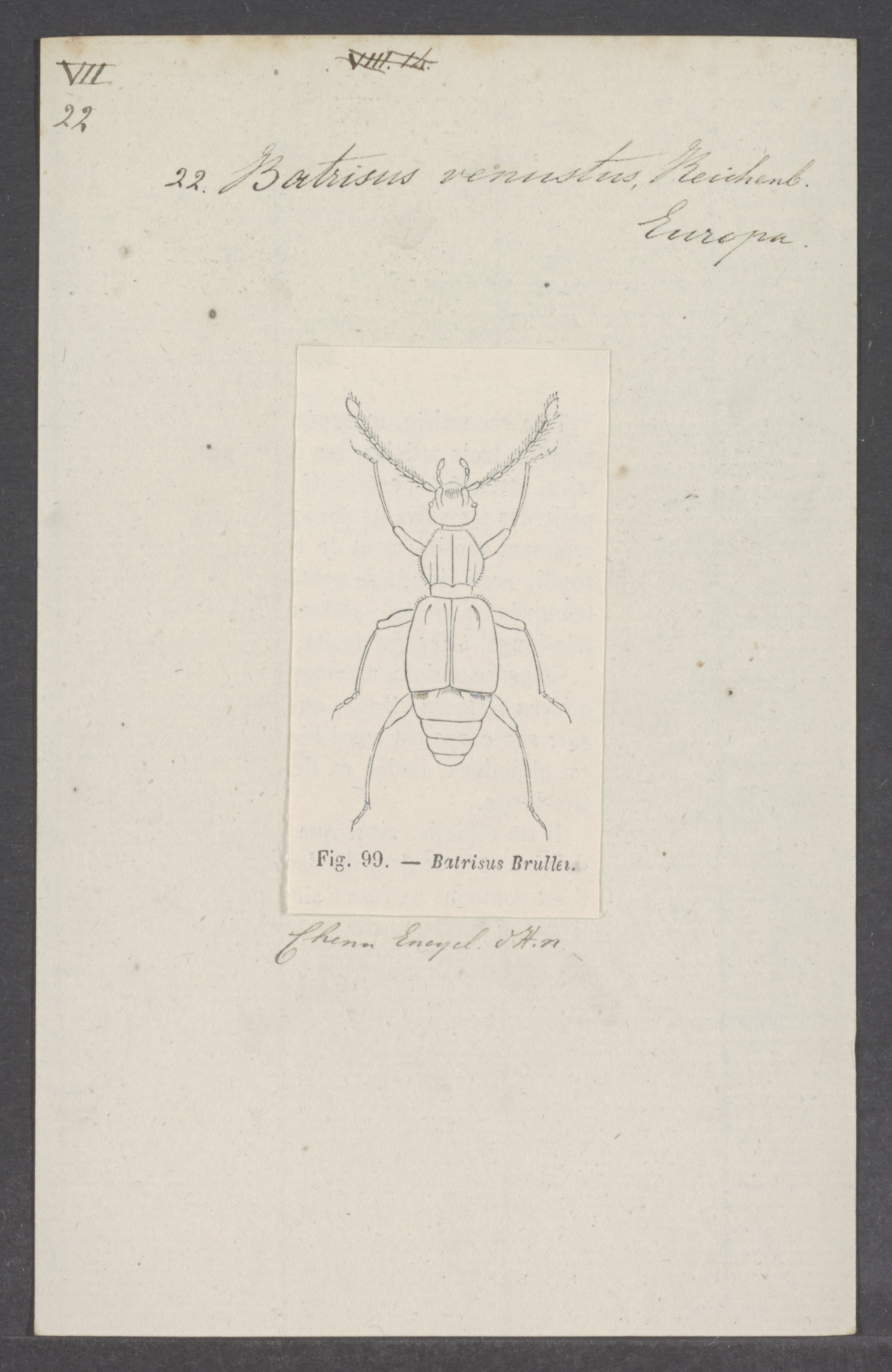

Scientific classification
- Kingdom: Animalia
- Phylum: Arthropoda
- Class: Insecta
- Order: Coleoptera
- Suborder: Polyphaga
- Infraorder: Staphyliniformia
- Family: Staphylinidae
- Subfamily: Pselaphinae
- Genus: Batrisus; Aubé, 1833

Synonyms
- Batristilbus Raffray, 1909

= Batrisus =

Genus of beetles

Batrisus is a genus of ant-loving beetles in the family Staphylinidae. There are numerous described species in Batrisus.

== Species ==
The species belonging to the genus Batrisus include but are not limited to:

- Batrisus angulipes (L. W. Schaufuss, 1882)
- Batrisus antennatus (Motschulsky, 1851)
- Batrisus antiquus (L. W. Schaufuss, 1890)
- Batrisus armigerides (Newton, 2017)
- Batrisus bryaxoides (Motschulsky, 1851)
- Batrisus crassipes (Sharp, 1887)
- Batrisus dennyi (Motschulsky, 1851)
- Batrisus erivanus (Motschulsky, 1845)
- Batrisus excavatus (Motschulsky, 1851)
- Batrisus formicarius (Aubé, 1883)
- Batrisus grouvellei (L. W. Schaufuss, 1882)
- Batrisus grypochirus (L. W. Schaufuss, 1882)
- Batrisus heterocerus (Motschulsky, 1851)
- Batrisus lamellipes (Sharp, 1887)
- Batrisus longulus (Motschulsky, 1851)
- Batrisus nodifrons (Motschulsky, 1851)
- Batrisus nodosus (Motschulsky, 1851)
- Batrisus obtusicornis (Motschulsky, 1845)
- Batrisus ormayi (Reitter, 1885)
- Batrisus pexus (Motschulsky, 1851)
- Batrisus piliferus (Motschulsky, 1851)
- Batrisus politus Sharp, 1883
- Batrisus pristinus (L. W. Schaufuss, 1890)
- Batrisus sibiricus (Sharp, 1874)
- Batrisus spiniventris (Motschulsky, 1851)
- Batrisus tauricu (Motschulsky, 1851)
- Batrisus taurus (Besuchet, 2004)
- Batrisus trichothorax (Tanokuchi, 1988)
