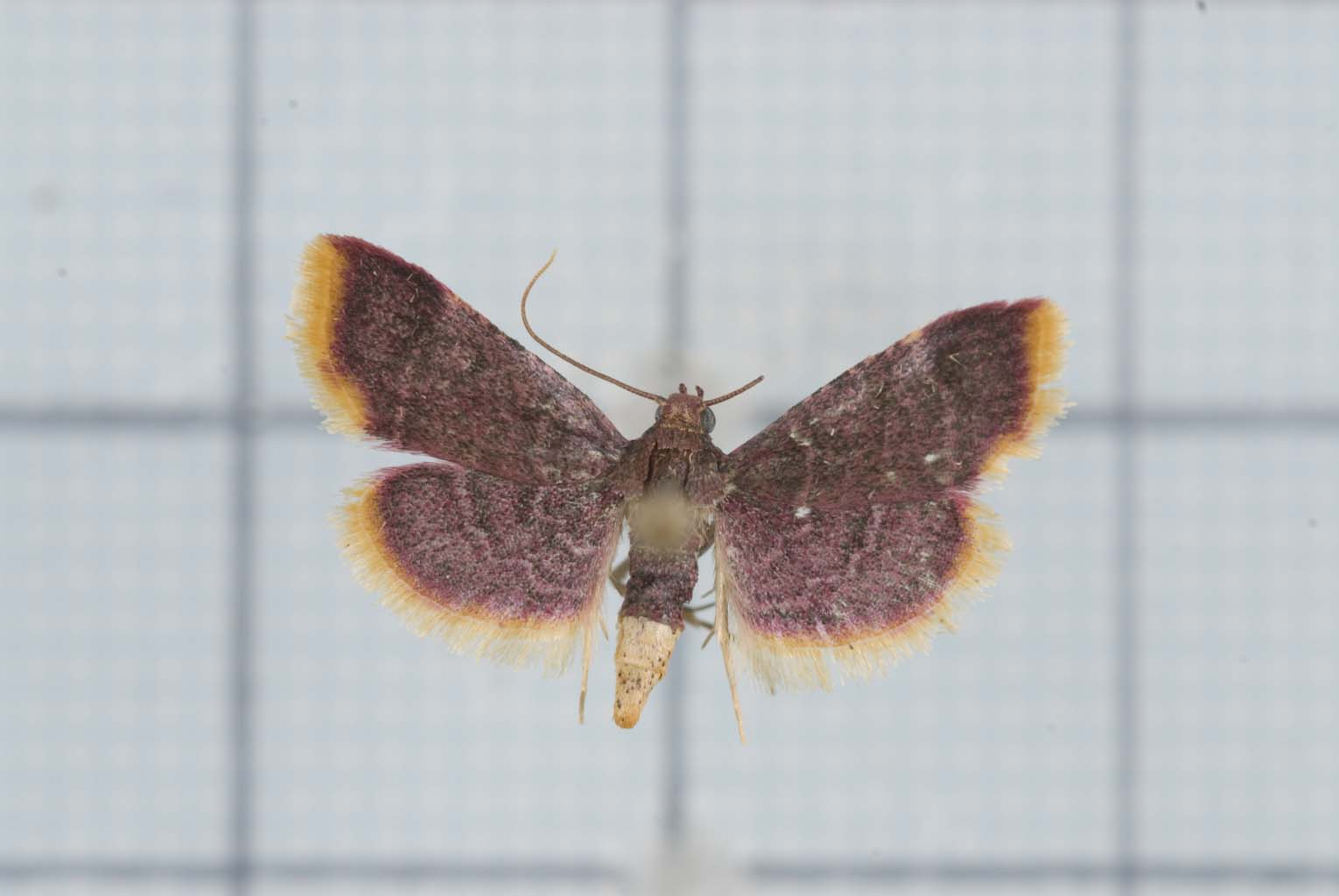

Scientific classification
- Kingdom: Animalia
- Phylum: Arthropoda
- Clade: Pancrustacea
- Class: Insecta
- Order: Lepidoptera
- Family: Pyralidae
- Genus: Hypsopygia
- Species: H. postflava

Binomial name
- Hypsopygia postflava (Hampson, 1893)

Synonyms
- Pyralis postflava Hampson, 1893

= Hypsopygia postflava =

Species of moth

Hypsopygia postflava is a species of snout moth in the genus Hypsopygia native to Southeast Asia. It is an obligate parasite of Polistes wasps.

== Description ==
The species was described by George Hampson in 1893 from a specimen collected in Sri Lanka. The moth has no common name in English but is called ウスムラサキシマメイガ in Japanese.

== Distribution ==
Hypsophygia postflava has been documented in India, Thailand, China, Taiwan, Japan, and Sri Lanka.

== Lifecycle ==
Hypsopygia postflava parasitizes the nests of the paper wasps Polistes jokahamae and Polistes olivaceus. The adult moth lays her eggs on the wasp nest. When the nest is undefended, eggs are laid singly or in small clumps on the walls of cells containing wasp pupae. If adult wasps are present to defend the nest, eggs are laid at the base (pedicel) of the nest.

The eggs hatch into larvae, which spin silk cocoons. The cocoons are created before the moth is ready to pupate and serve as a shelter for the vulnerable larva. The moth larvae prey on the wasp pupae first, followed by the wasp larvae.

The larvae pupate and emerge as adult moths. The adults live only 6-9 days. The total duration of the lifecycle lasts from 37-53 days dependent on local climate and food availability. One to three generations are produced in a year. Larvae which have not yet pupated may spend the winter in wasp nests.
