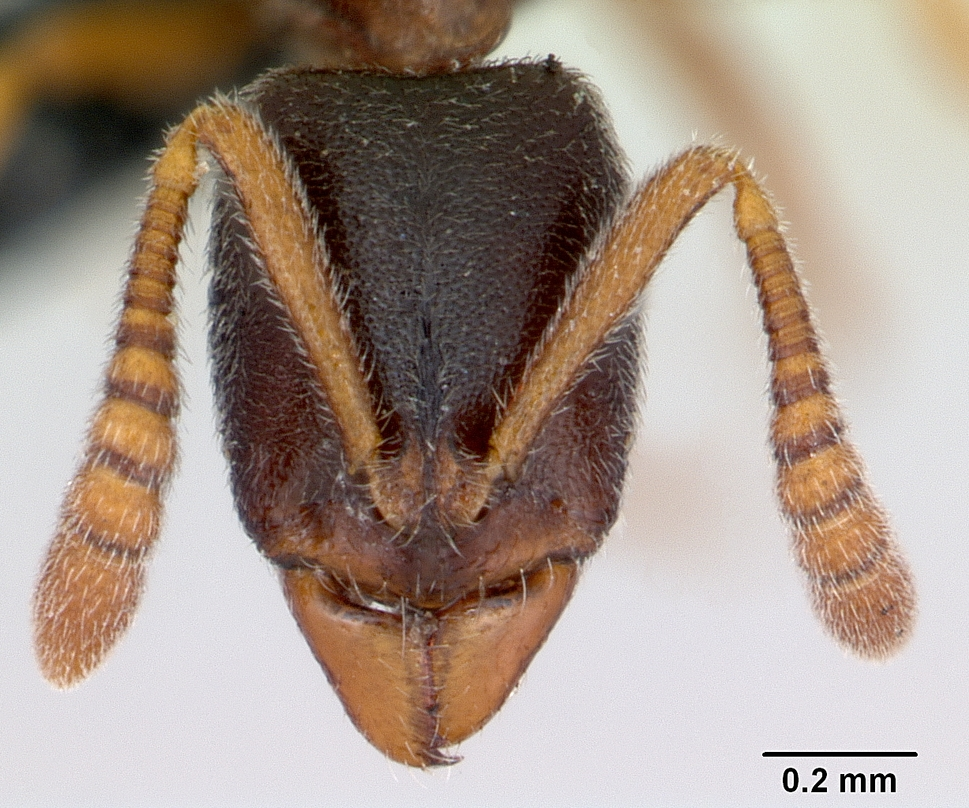
- Ponera coarctata worker head

Scientific classification
- Kingdom: Animalia
- Phylum: Arthropoda
- Clade: Pancrustacea
- Class: Insecta
- Order: Hymenoptera
- Family: Formicidae
- Genus: Ponera
- Species: P. coarctata

Binomial name
- Ponera coarctata (Latreille, 1802)

= Ponera coarctata =

Species of ant

Ponera coarctata is a species of ant native to Europe, the Caucasus region, the Anatolia peninsula, north Africa, central and eastern Asia and on the eastern coast of the US. Closely related to the P. pennsylvanica species, the species was discovered in 1802 by Pierre André Latreille.

== Description ==
P. coarctata' workers are a light to dark brown, with few hairs, though the density of the hairs increase on the ant's gaster. Their eyes are very small and usually difficult to see.

The queens are very similar to workers, though they are larger and bear larger and more obvious eyes.

Workers measure at 3.0 – 3.5mm, queens at 4.0 – 4.5mm and males measure at 3.4 – 3.8mm.

In general, the species show to be smaller in size and lighter in colour when closer to the Mediterranean when compared to samples from more northern Europe, this trait is shared with the closely related species P. pennsylvanica. The difference in colouration is thought to be due to the drier climate.

== Distribution and habitat ==
Ponera coarctata has a wide distribution, spreading across much of the palearctic realm. It covers all of Europe, though has not been recorded in Sweden, Finland, Norway, the Baltic states or Belarus. The ant is present across much of central Asia and south Russia, as well as being native to the Caucasus, Turkey, Iran, Iraq, Syria and Israel. The ant is also distributed across the north Algerian and Tunisian coast and Morocco.

The species has records on the east coast of the US though these records are considered dubious.

The ant seems to prefer damp soil, though will nest in any warm, sheltered habitat. They have been found in open woodland, grassland, rocky ground and crumbling cliffs.

== Biology ==
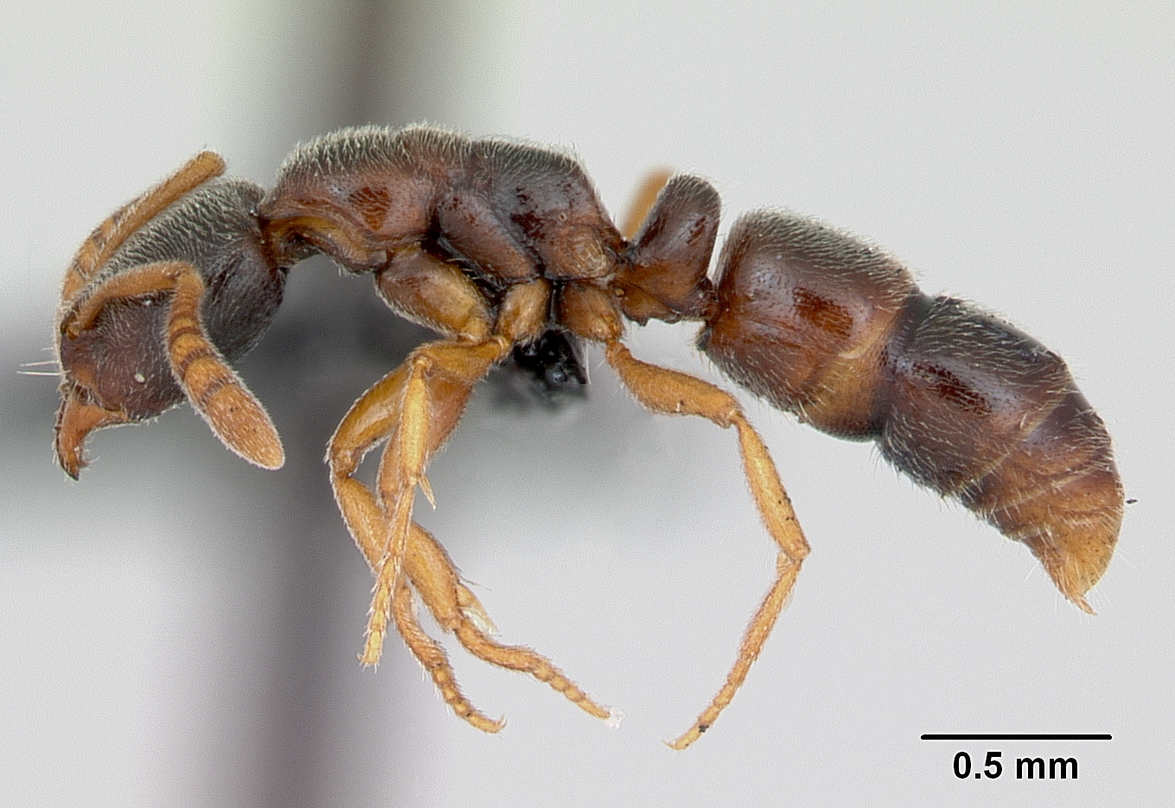
P. coarctata worker profile view

Ponera coarctata builds small colonies, typically less than 40–100 workers with a singular queen. Their nests have been observed to have one or two small chambers, with only a few corridors running between them.

Their diet is mostly predatory, commonly eating developing invertebrates. Workers forage one at a time, found in soil, litter and moss. They are noted as being a slow moving species as they hunt.

Alates are observed to fly in late summer and early autumn (August–September).

== See also ==
- List of ants of Great Britain
