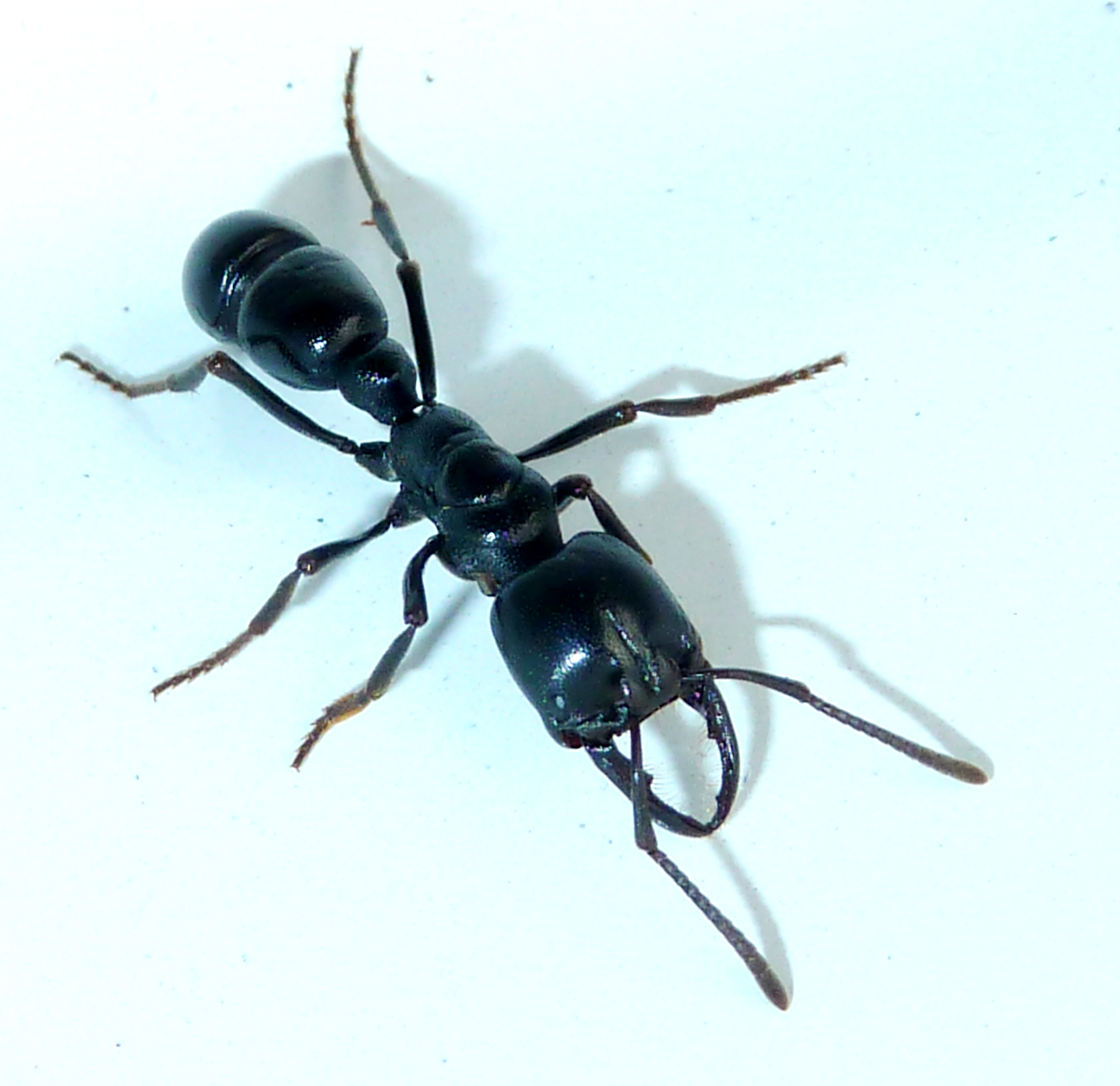
- Plectroctena mandibularis worker

Scientific classification
- Kingdom: Animalia
- Phylum: Arthropoda
- Clade: Pancrustacea
- Class: Insecta
- Order: Hymenoptera
- Family: Formicidae
- Genus: Plectroctena
- Species: P. mandibularis

Binomial name
- Plectroctena mandibularis F.Smith, 1858

Synonyms
- Plectroctena major

= Plectroctena mandibularis =

Species of ant

Plectroctena mandibularis, called the ringbum ant or millipede munching ant, is a large species of ant that ranges from the Eastern Cape, South Africa, through East Africa to Ethiopia. Their workers forage singly in open terrain, and their colony size seldom exceeds fifty individuals. It is one of the large Plectroctena species, including P. conjugata and P. minor, that specialize on adult millipedes as prey. The nest is composed of chambers that are typically located two feet or more below the surface, and the nest entrances are usually marked by large piles of earth. They get their colloquial, common name from their tendency to prey on millipedes.
