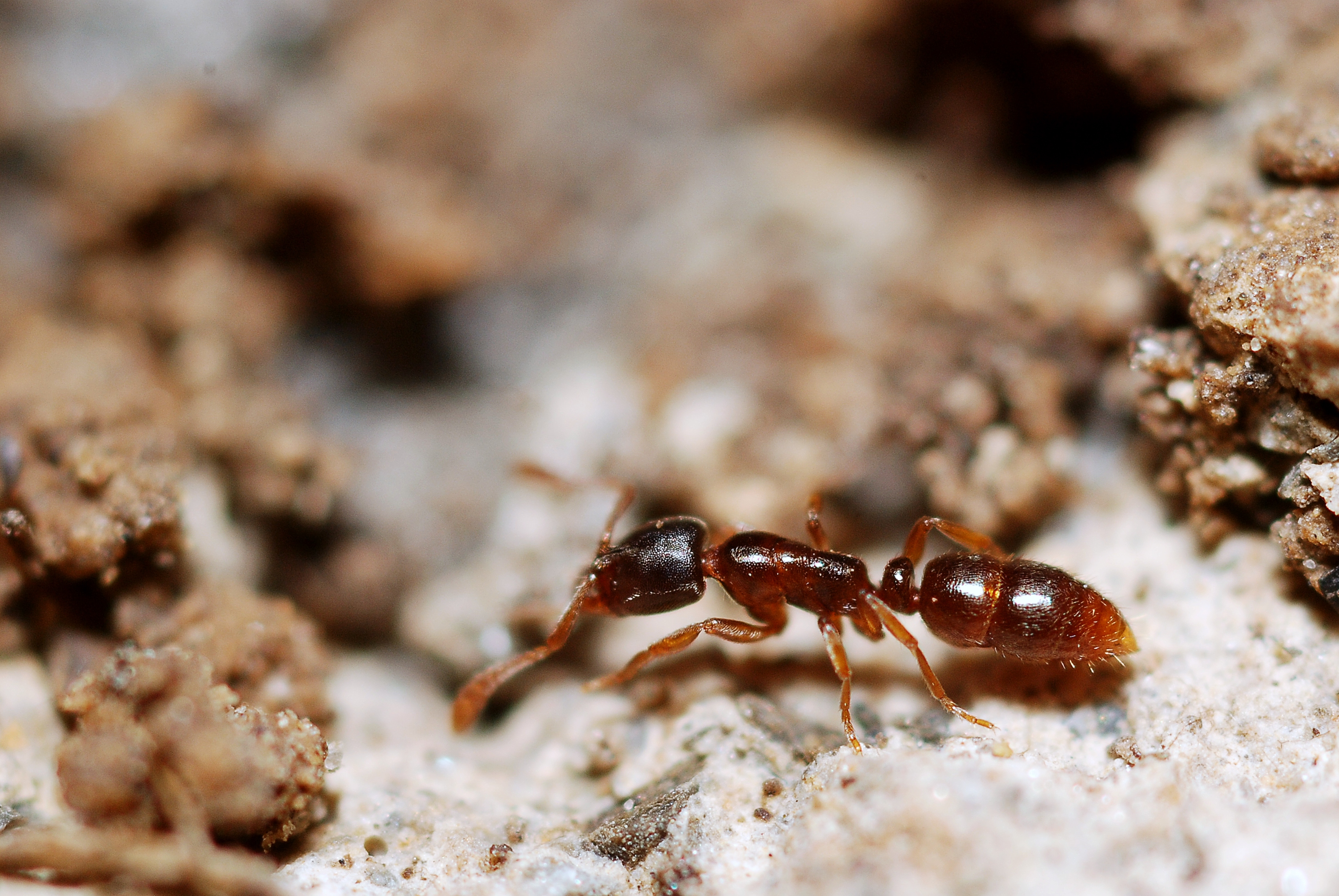
- Ponera sp.

Scientific classification
- Kingdom: Animalia
- Phylum: Arthropoda
- Clade: Pancrustacea
- Class: Insecta
- Order: Hymenoptera
- Family: Formicidae
- Subfamily: Ponerinae
- Tribe: Ponerini
- Alliance: Ponera genus group
- Genus: Ponera; Latreille, 1804

Type species
- Formica coarctata Latreille, 1802

Diversity
- 66 species

Synonyms
- Pseudocryptopone Wheeler, W.M., 1933; Pteroponera Bernard, 1950; Selenopone Wheeler, W.M., 1933

= Ponera =

Genus of ants

Ponera is a genus of ponerine ants. The name is the Latinized form (Ponēra) of the Ancient Greek ponēra (πονηρά, 'wicked, wretched').

== Description ==
Workers are very small to small in size (1–4 mm); queen are similar to workers but winged. This genus is very similar to Cryptopone, Hypoponera and Pachycondyla.

== Biology ==
Ponera nests contain less than 100 workers in protected places on the ground, most often in the soil or in cracks, rotten wood, under bark or moss on rotten logs.

== Distribution ==
Ponera is known from the Holarctic, Samoa, New Guinea and Australia.

== Species ==
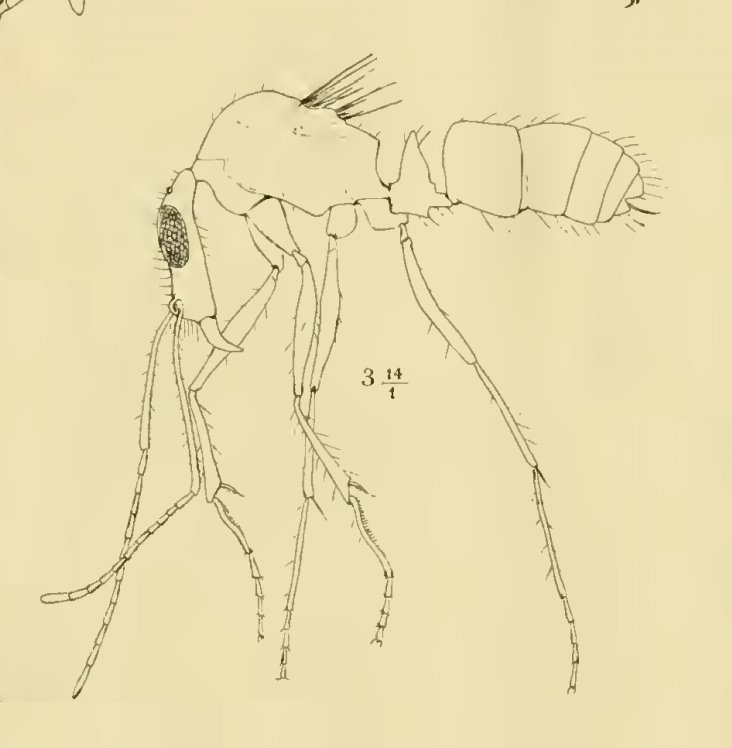
Illustration of Ponera leptocephala in Sicilian amber

- Ponera alisana Terayama, 1986
- Ponera alpha Taylor, 1967
- Ponera augusta Taylor, 1967
- Ponera bableti Perrault, 1993
- Ponera baka Xu, 2001
- Ponera bawana Xu, 2001
- Ponera bishamon Terayama, 1996
- Ponera borneensis Taylor, 1967
- Ponera chapmani Taylor, 1967
- Ponera chiponensis Terayama, 1986
- Ponera clavicornis Emery, 1900
- Ponera coarctata (Latreille, 1802)
- Ponera colaensis Mann, 1921
- Ponera diodonta Xu, 2001
- †Ponera elegantissima Meunier, 1923
- Ponera elegantula Wilson, 1957
- Ponera exotica Smith, 1962
- Ponera guangxiensis Zhou, 2001
- Ponera hubeiensis Wang & Zhao, 2009
- Ponera incerta (Wheeler, 1933)
- Ponera indica Bharti & Wachkoo, 2012
- Ponera japonica Wheeler, 1906
- Ponera kohmoku Terayama, 1996
- Ponera leae Forel, 1913
- †Ponera leptocephala Emery, 1891
- †Ponera lobulifera Dlussky, 2009
- Ponera loi Taylor, 1967
- Ponera longlina Xu, 2001
- Ponera manni Taylor, 1967
- †Ponera mayri Dlussky, 2009
- Ponera menglana Xu, 2001
- Ponera nangongshana Xu, 2001
- Ponera norfolkensis Wheeler, 1935
- Ponera oreas (Wheeler, 1933)
- Ponera paedericera Zhou, 2001
- Ponera pennsylvanica Buckley, 1866
- Ponera pentodontos Xu, 2001
- Ponera petila Wilson, 1957
- Ponera pianmana Xu, 2001
- Ponera rishen Terayama, 2009
- Ponera ruficornis Spinola, 1851
- Ponera scabra Wheeler, 1928
- Ponera selenophora Emery, 1900
- Ponera shennong Terayama, 2009
- Ponera sikkimensis Bharti & Rilta, 2015
- Ponera sinensis Wheeler, 1928
- Ponera swezeyi (Wheeler, 1933)
- Ponera syscena Wilson, 1957
- Ponera sysphinctoides Bernard, 1950
- Ponera szaboi Wilson, 1957
- Ponera szentivanyi Wilson, 1957
- Ponera taipingensis Forel, 1913
- Ponera taiyangshen Terayama, 2009
- Ponera takaminei Terayama, 1996
- Ponera tamon Terayama, 1996
- Ponera taylori Bharti & Wachkoo, 2012
- Ponera tenuis (Emery, 1900)
- Ponera terayamai Leong, Guénard, Shiao & Lin, 2019
- Ponera testacea Emery, 1895
- Ponera tudigong Pierce, Leong & Guénard, 2019
- †Ponera wheeleri Dlussky, 2009
- Ponera woodwardi Taylor, 1967
- Ponera wui Leong, Guénard, Shiao & Lin, 2019
- Ponera xantha Xu, 2001
- Ponera xenagos Wilson, 1957
- Ponera yuhuang Terayama, 2009
