= Myrmica microrubra =

Scientific classification
- Domain: Eukaryota
- Kingdom: Animalia
- Phylum: Arthropoda
- Class: Insecta
- Order: Hymenoptera
- Family: Formicidae
- Subfamily: Myrmicinae
- Genus: Myrmica
- Species: M. microrubra

Binomial name
- Myrmica microrubra Seifert, 1993

Species of ant

Myrmica microrubra is currently not considered a true species, but rather a form of queens within the species Myrmica rubra. It can be found in Austria, Bulgaria, Finland, France, Germany, Great Britain, Poland, Ukraine, and the Netherlands.
