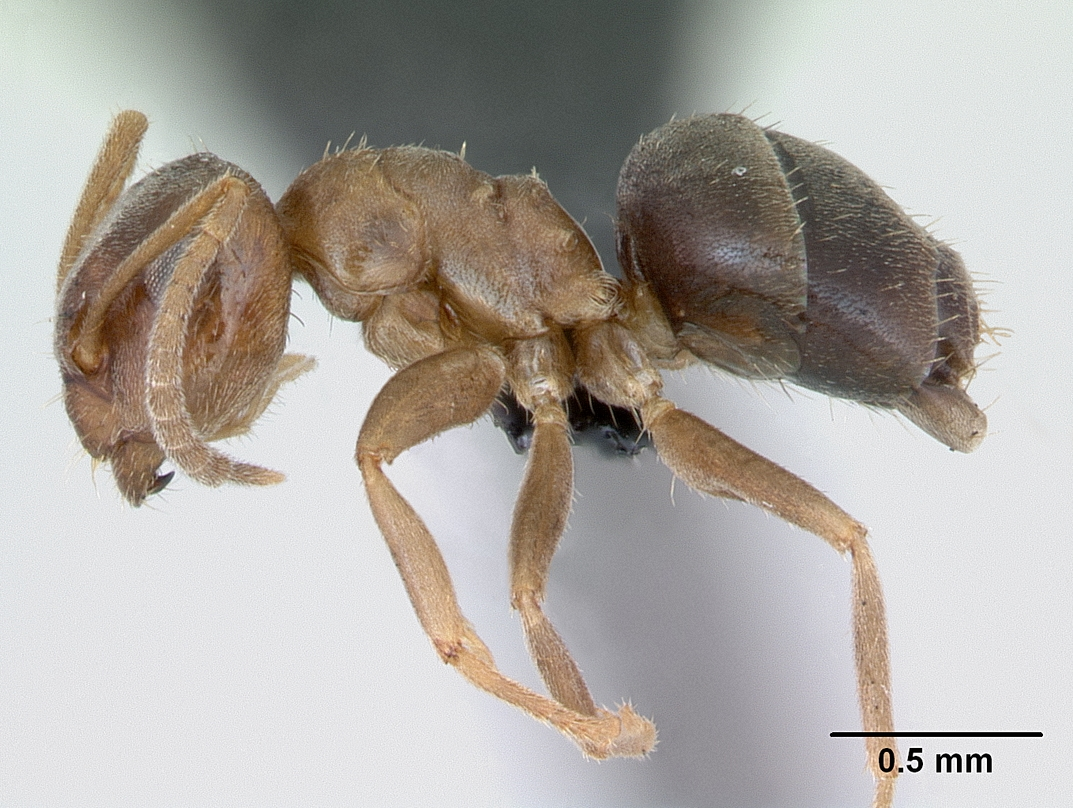
- Worker

Scientific classification
- Kingdom: Animalia
- Phylum: Arthropoda
- Class: Insecta
- Order: Hymenoptera
- Family: Formicidae
- Subfamily: Formicinae
- Genus: Lasius
- Species: L. brunneus

Binomial name
- Lasius brunneus (Latreille, 1798)

= Lasius brunneus =

Species of ant

Lasius brunneus is a species of ant in the genus Lasius. The species is widely distributed in Europe, from Sweden in the north to Anatolia in the south. In England this species is almost always found nesting in oak trees or rotting wood mainly foraging in trees but has also been found under stones and foraging on the ground. It is thought to be underrecorded but is fairly common especially in the South East.

Workers are easy to identify as they are bicoloured, but they can be confused with Lasius emarginatus. Nuptial flights have been recorded as early as May on warm days from early morning to early afternoon. Queens are smaller than other Lasius species, mainly a uniform dark brown colour with a flattish, slim appearance.
