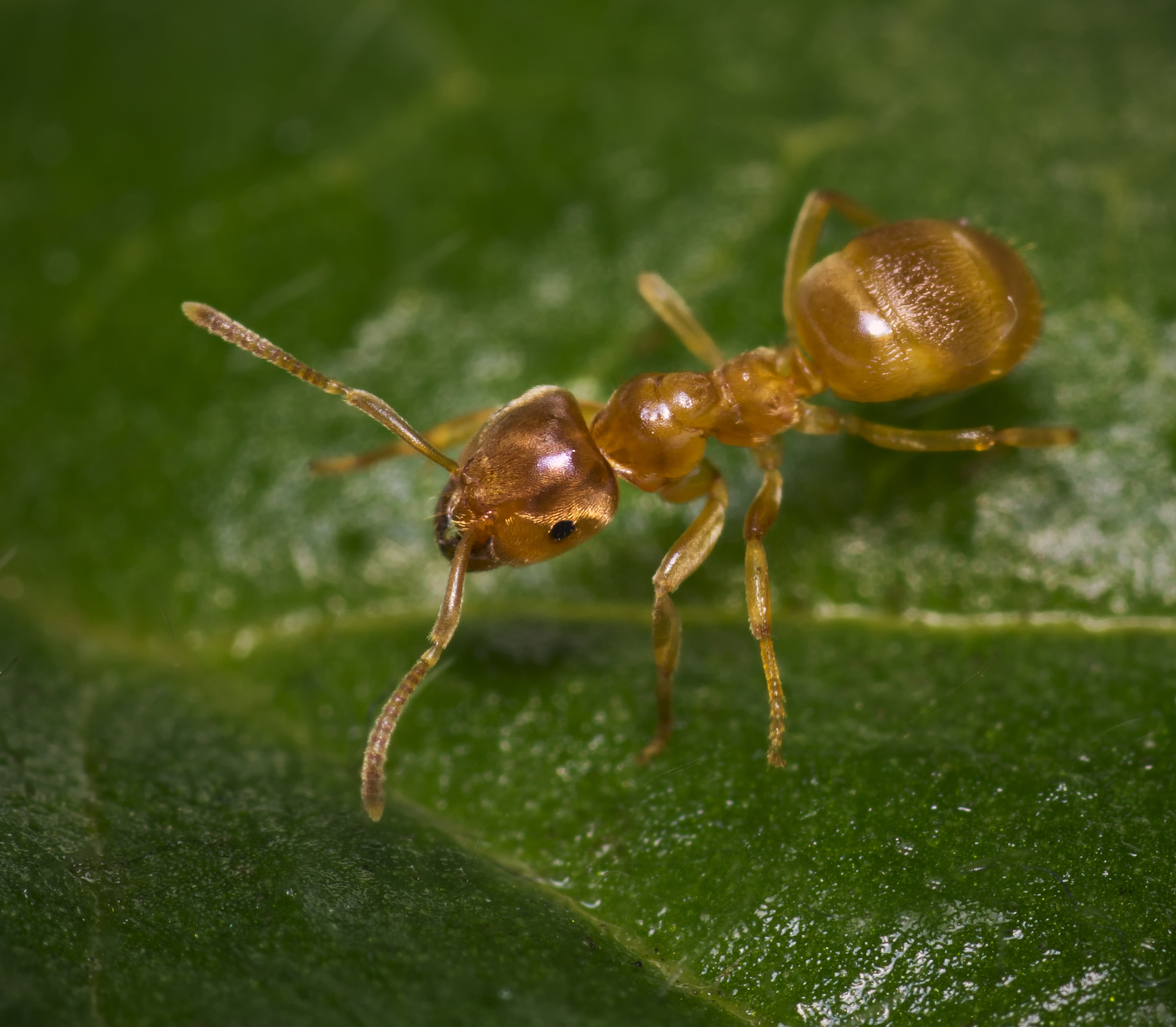

Scientific classification
- Domain: Eukaryota
- Kingdom: Animalia
- Phylum: Arthropoda
- Class: Insecta
- Order: Hymenoptera
- Family: Formicidae
- Subfamily: Formicinae
- Genus: Lasius
- Subgenus: Cautolasius
- Species: L. flavus

Binomial name
- Lasius flavus (Fabricius, 1782)

= Yellow meadow ant =

Species of ant

The yellow meadow ant (Lasius flavus), also known as the yellow hill ant, is a species of ant occurring in Europe (where it is one of the most common ants), Asia, and North Africa. As of 2018, populations in North America are considered a different, related species, Lasius brevicornis.

The queen is 7–9 mm long, males 3–4 mm and workers 2–4 mm. Their colour varies from yellow to brown, with queen and males being slightly more darkly colored.

The species lives primarily underground in meadows and very commonly, lawns. The nests are often completely overgrown by grass, however, often their presence is betrayed by small mounds of loose soil material between the grass stalks. They will also nest under large rocks or concrete slabs. Lawn nesting will eventually become obvious as the aphids clear sections of grass or portions of gardens.

The yellow meadow ant feeds on the honeydew from root aphids, which they breed in their nests. During winter, the aphids themselves are sometimes eaten. As a consequence of their feeding habits, the species only occasionally forages outside the nest. Evidence of their underground lives is their lack of pigmentation and the smaller size of their eyes, compared to closely related species like the black garden ant. They are a timid species and will often simply barricade their tunnels to fight off invaders.

Alates (winged, unmated queens and males) can be seen on warm days and evenings of July and August. This is one of the rare times that they are seen, as workers open up their nest entrances and herd the young winged ants out of the nest. Colonies are often founded by multiple queens (pleometrosis). Later on, when the first workers emerge, fights between the founder queens will erupt, with only one queen left (monogyne). However, this species is also known to have single colonies with multiple queens and up to 250,000 workers, when they are spread out over multiple interconnected nests.

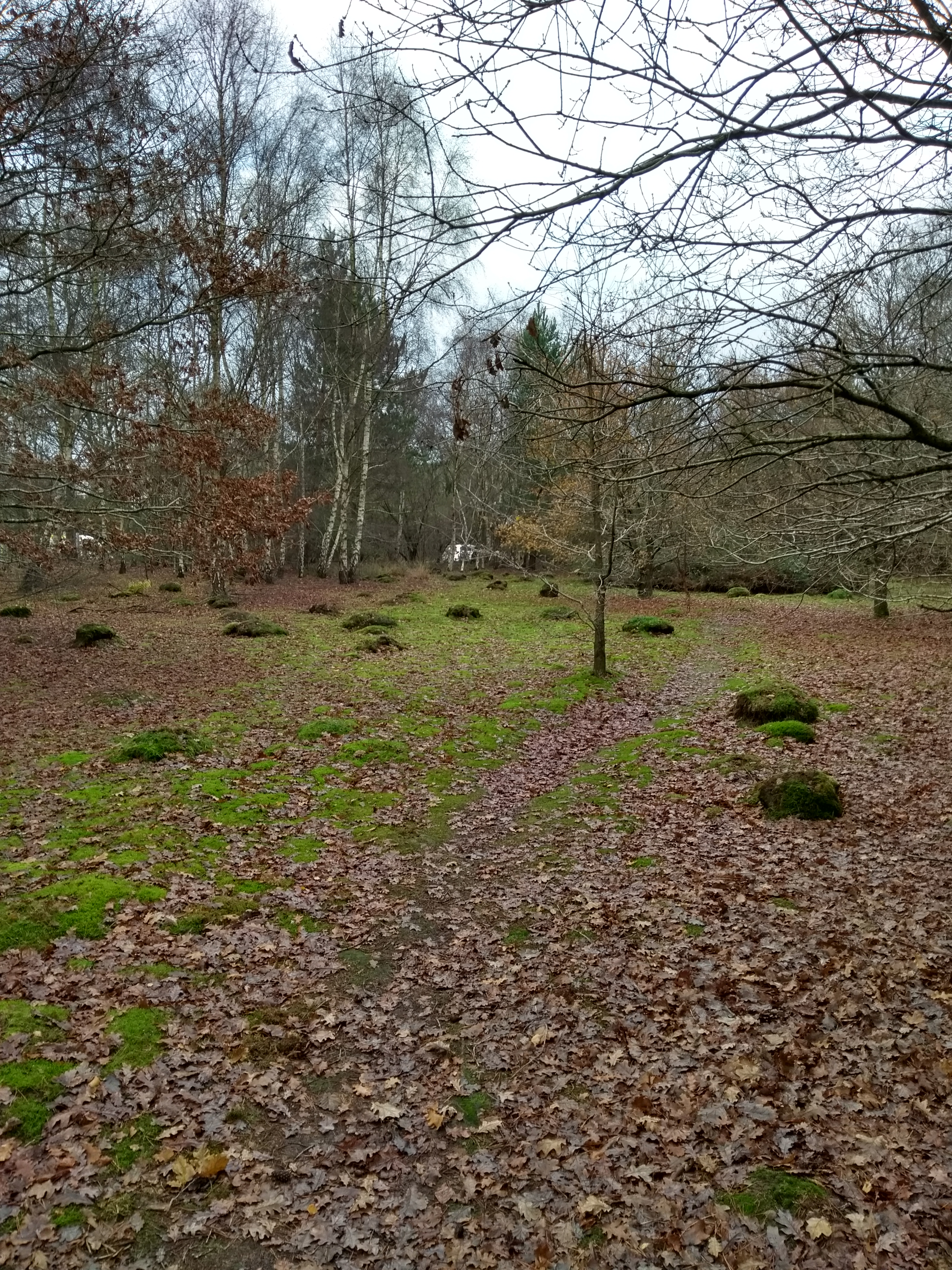
Relict yellow meadow ant nests in an area reverted to woodland
