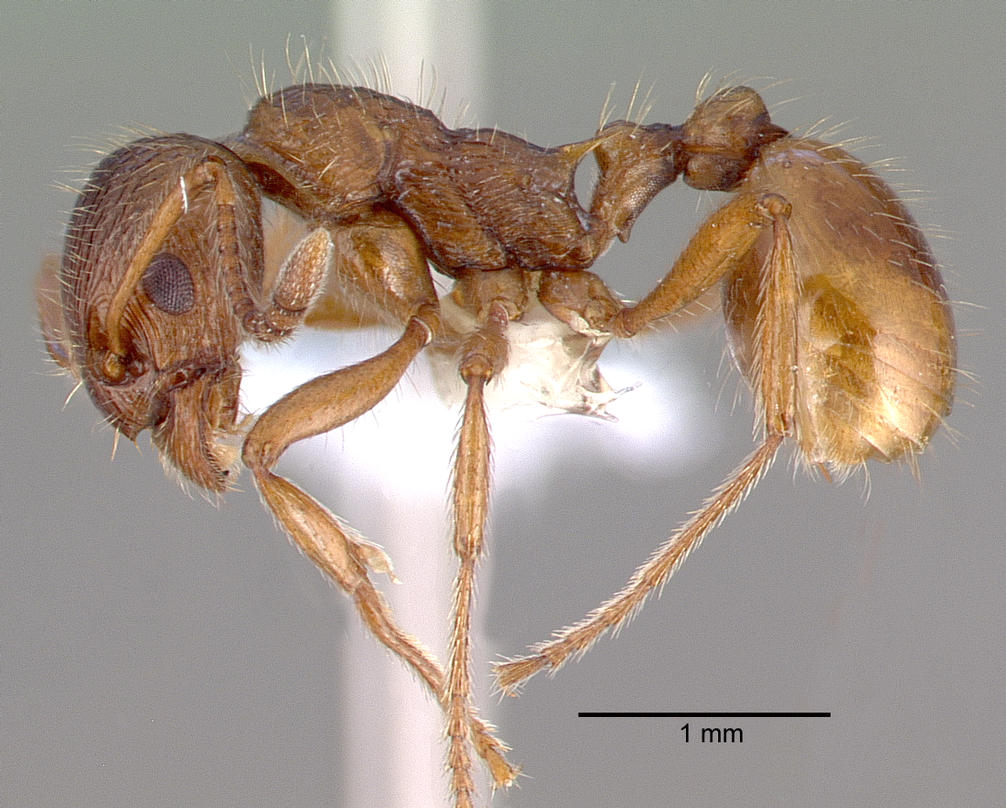
- Worker

Scientific classification
- Kingdom: Animalia
- Phylum: Arthropoda
- Clade: Pancrustacea
- Class: Insecta
- Order: Hymenoptera
- Family: Formicidae
- Subfamily: Myrmicinae
- Genus: Myrmica
- Species: M. rubra

Binomial name
- Myrmica rubra (Linnaeus, 1758)

= Myrmica rubra =

Species of ant

Myrmica rubra, also known in the UK as the common red ant or in the USA as the European fire ant, is a species of ant of the genus Myrmica. It is found across Europe and is now invasive in some parts of North America and Asia. It is mainly red in colour, with slightly darker pigmentation on the head. These ants live under stones and fallen trees, and in soil. They are aggressive, often attacking rather than running away, and are equipped with a stinger, though they lack the ability to spray formic acid like the genus Formica.

This species is very similar to M. ruginodis, M. rubra is common in Southern England and becomes rarer further north whereas M. ruginodis is common all over the UK including Northern Scotland.

The larvae of the butterflies Phengaris alcon (Alcon blue) and P. teleius (scarce large blue) use M. rubra as their primary host.

Research from the University of Maine suggests that a certain type of nematode might be a catalyst for colony collapse, which suggests a possible management method for Myrmica rubra.

== Distribution and habitat ==
This is one of the most common and widespread Myrmica species of the Palaearctic. It occurs in the region stretching from Portugal to East Siberia (as far as Transbaikalia), and from northern Greece to the forest-tundra zone in the North. It has also been introduced to North America in northwestern and northeastern United States and in western Canada, where it is considered an invasive species.

These ants are very common in Europe and the UK and live in meadows and gardens. They live on a diet of honeydew excreted by aphids and feed on many types of insect and other invertebrates. They will attack any creature that disturbs their nest, but are not as aggressive as the red imported fire ant. They also consume pollen, a phenomenon rarely documented in ants of the temperate zone.

== Identification ==
Workers are yellowish brown in colour, 3.5 to 5.5 mm in length and have smooth and shiny frontal triangle and subspinal areas and long and slender antennal scapes. Queens are similar to workers with larger thorax to store wing muscles, typically 5.5 to 7.0 mm in length. Males have a darker body colour compared to queens and workers. There is a reproductive morph M. microrubra that was formerly believed to be a social parasite of M. rubra.Their queens are smaller in size and more comparable to that of the worker.

== Behaviour ==
This ant's colonies have a polygyne form and can include up to one hundred queens per nest. These queens will have gathered together after their nuptial flight, formed a nest and laid their eggs in it. The species is also polydomous, with many nest sites per individual colony. The queens can live up to fifteen years. Nuptial flights take place normally in late July to mid-August in Europe. Hundreds of young queens and males take to the air to mate together. Afterwards, the males die and the queens shed their wings to make a new colony. No nuptial flights have been witnessed yet from this species where it is living in North America, however male-only mating swarms have been recorded in Newfoundland, Canada.

In addition to the regular queens (macrogynes), M. rubra also have a microgyne caste. These queens are smaller in size compared to the macrogyne and were previously believed to be a different species of social parasite (M. microrubra). More recent DNA analysis suggest that they share a gene pool with the macrogyne and are therefor not a different species. While the roles of these microgynes are not yet fully understood, they are often found in nests with regular queens and this is believed to be a form of intraspecific parasitism where the microgyne are a social parasite of the larger macrogyne. The microgynes are also known to act as an alternative reproductive morph and found their own colonies.

The ants explore the surrounding area around their nest and look for materials, both plant and animal, to feed their colonies. When they find dead bodies, undertakers pick up the dead bodies and quickly carry them away from their nest up to 3 metres (9.8 ft) away. They choose locations randomly, and so this species does not create cemeteries.
