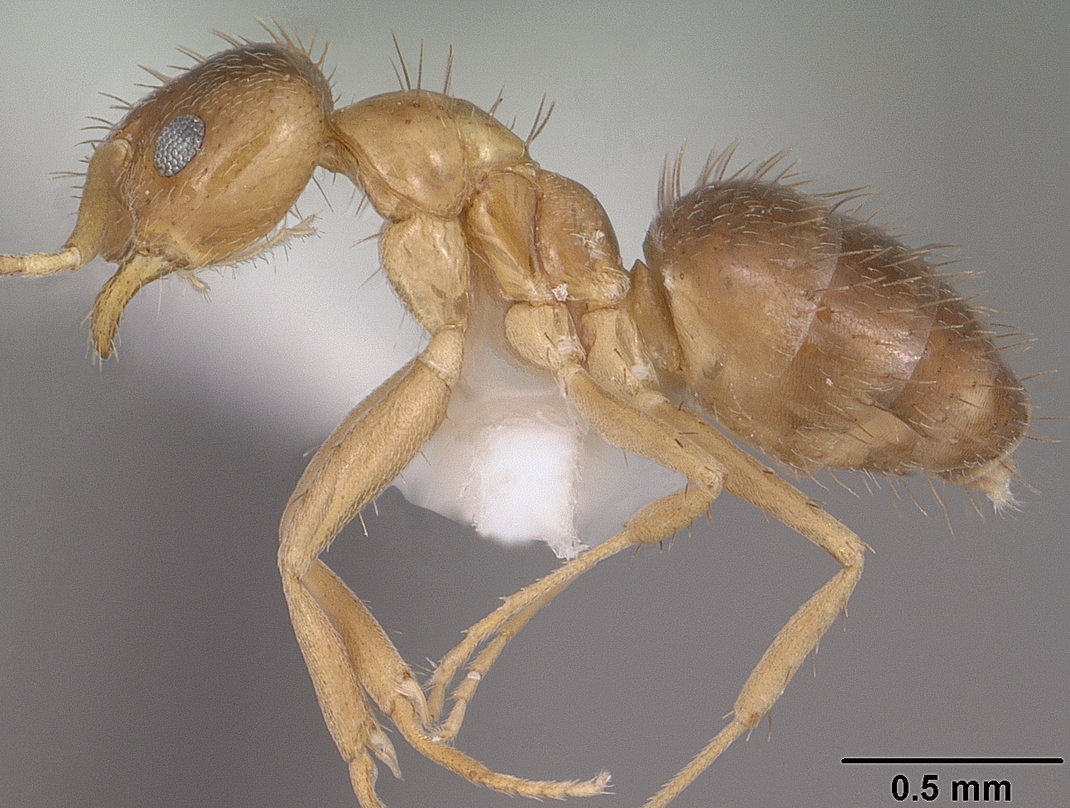

Scientific classification
- Domain: Eukaryota
- Kingdom: Animalia
- Phylum: Arthropoda
- Class: Insecta
- Order: Hymenoptera
- Family: Formicidae
- Subfamily: Formicinae
- Genus: Paratrechina
- Species: P. vividula

Binomial name
- Paratrechina vividula (Nylander, 1846)

= Paratrechina vividula =

Species of insect

Paratrechina vividula is a species of ant belonging to the family Formicidae.

It has cosmopolitan distribution.
