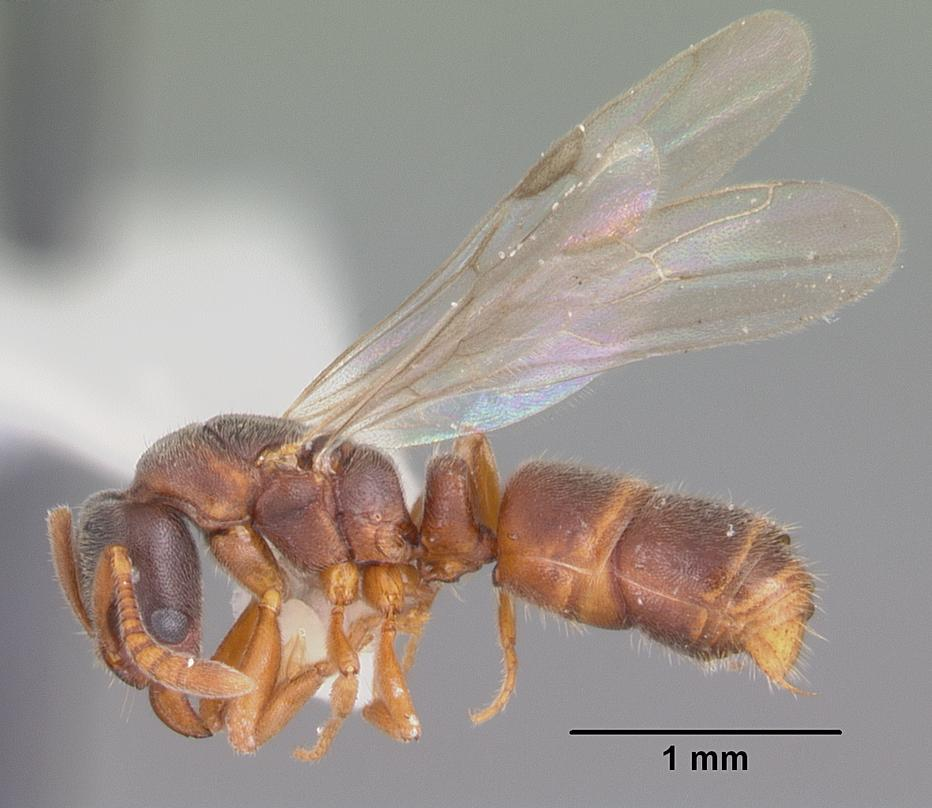
- Queen

Scientific classification
- Kingdom: Animalia
- Phylum: Arthropoda
- Clade: Pancrustacea
- Class: Insecta
- Order: Hymenoptera
- Family: Formicidae
- Genus: Ponera
- Species: P. pennsylvanica

Binomial name
- Ponera pennsylvanica (Latreille, 1804)

= Ponera pennsylvanica =

Species of ant

Ponera pennsylvanica is a species of ant that is usually found in mesic forests in Eastern North America. The species' nests are usually found under rotting logs, in rotting stumps or logs, in acorns, in soil, and in leaf mold. Ant colonies usually have no more than 100 worker ants.
