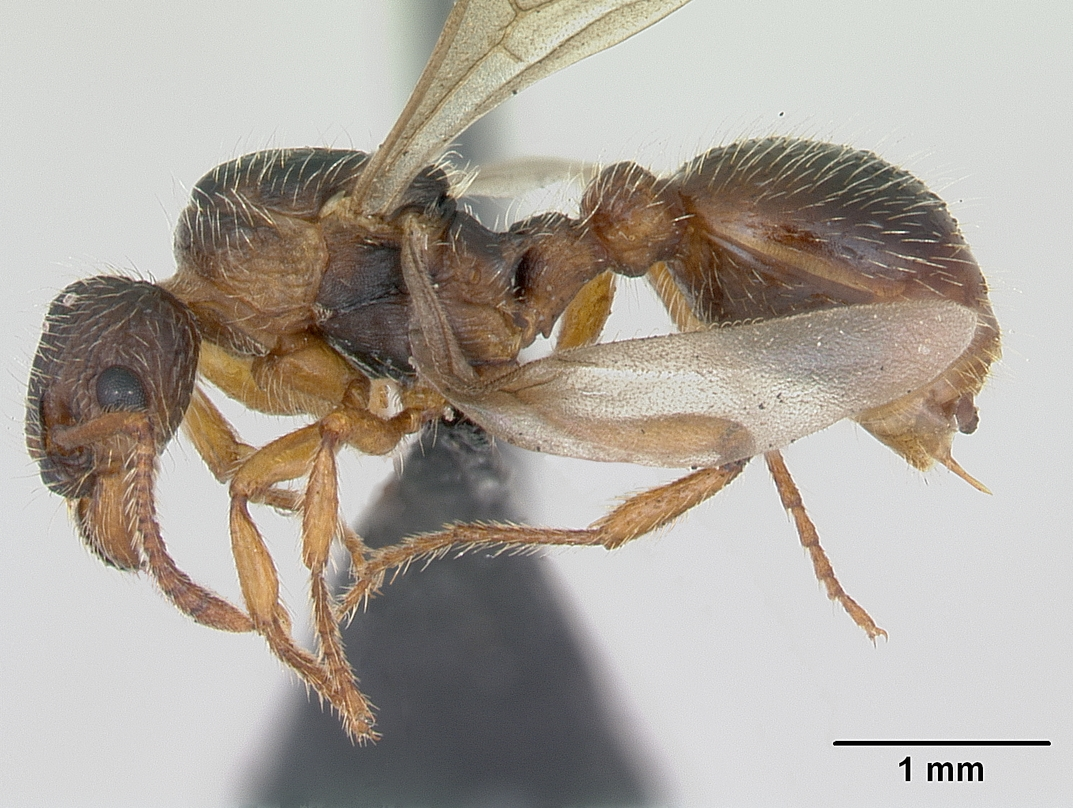

Scientific classification
- Domain: Eukaryota
- Kingdom: Animalia
- Phylum: Arthropoda
- Class: Insecta
- Order: Hymenoptera
- Family: Formicidae
- Subfamily: Myrmicinae
- Genus: Myrmica
- Species: M. hirsuta

Binomial name
- Myrmica hirsuta Elmes, 1978

= Myrmica hirsuta =

Species of insect

Myrmica hirsuta is a species of ant belonging to the family Formicidae.

It is native to Europe.
