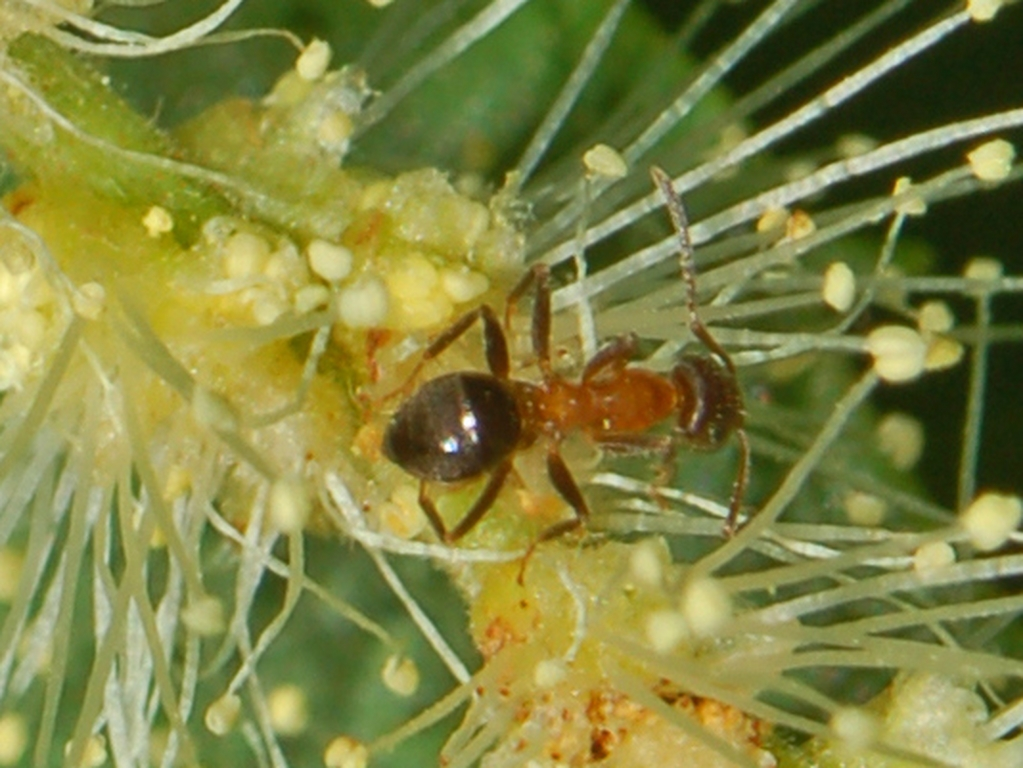

Scientific classification
- Kingdom: Animalia
- Phylum: Arthropoda
- Clade: Pancrustacea
- Class: Insecta
- Order: Hymenoptera
- Family: Formicidae
- Subfamily: Formicinae
- Genus: Lasius
- Species: L. emarginatus

Binomial name
- Lasius emarginatus (Olivier, 1792)

= Lasius emarginatus =

Species of ant

Lasius emarginatus is a species of boreal formicine ants native to western Eurasia. It has gained notoriety as the invasive ManhattAnt in the United States.

== Description ==
Lasius emarginatus is a small ant, reaching 3–5.5 mm in the workers, 7–10 mm in the females and 7–14.5 mm in males. In workers and females, the thorax is reddish or brownish-red, while the head and the abdomen are brown. Males are completely brown.

A queen may live for 30 years, but for workers, lifespan is limited to three years. The species is omnivorous. They are not aggressive but do not mind attacking a potential predator or another colony to expand their hunting and harvesting territory.

== Distribution ==
This species is present in the Western Palearctic (Europe, the Caucasus, and Asia Minor). As an invasive species, it is now found in Manhattan where it has taken on the niche of above-ground-level floors in taller buildings.

=== ManhattAnt ===
A May 2024 report published in Biological Invasions details the rapid spread of the so-called "ManhattAnt" since its initial appearance in New York City in 2011. Lasius emarginatus has become a dominant urban pest despite its relatively minor role in its native habitat. This invasive species is expanding its territory at an estimated rate of approximately one mile per year, raising concerns among researchers about potential ecological disruptions across the East Coast.

== Colony founding ==
The nuptial flight happens between June and August. Although normal independent colony foundation is usual, it can also be achieved through pleometrosis, a process in which several queens work together to start the colony. Eventually, the future workers will kill or drive away all queens but the dominant one.
