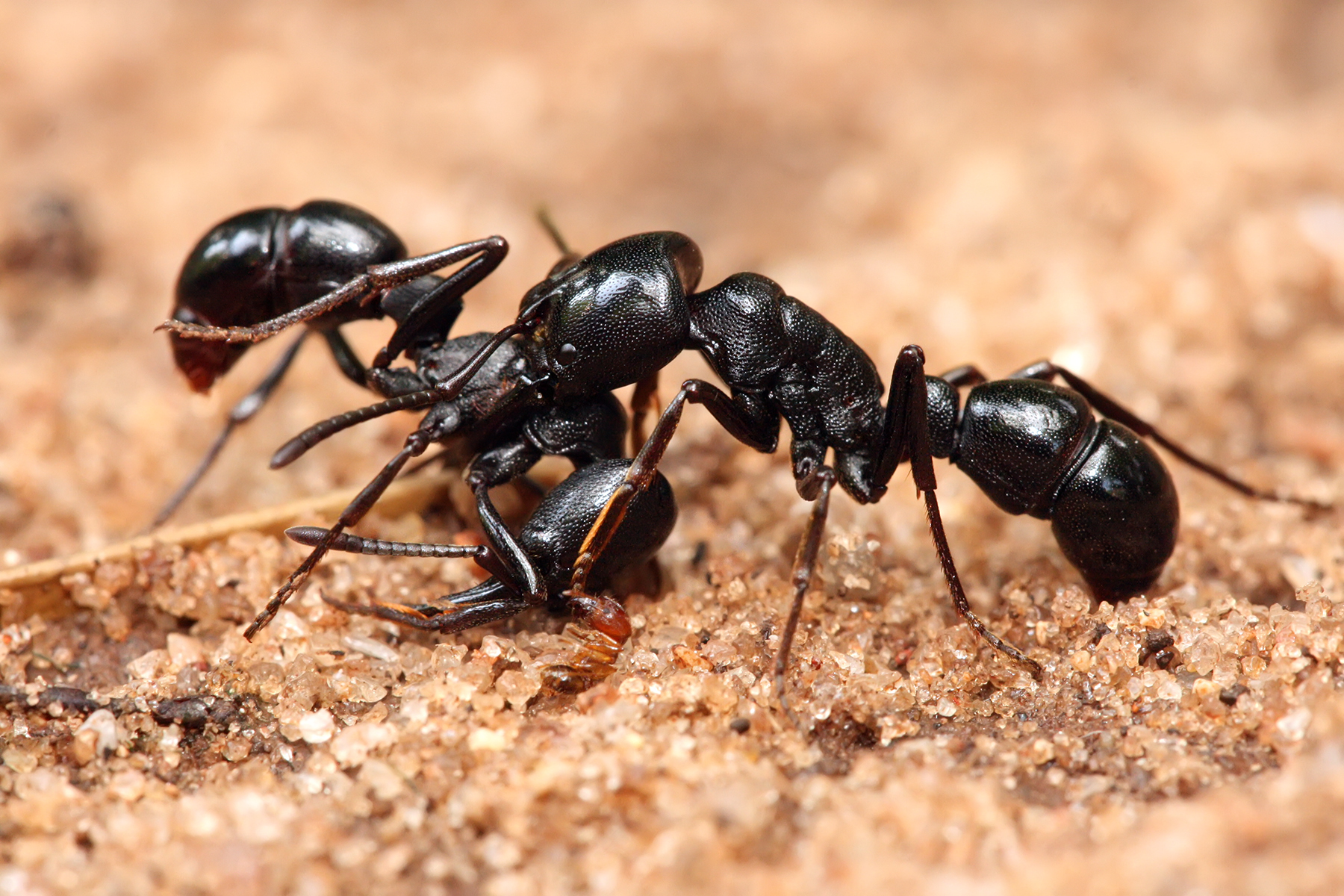
- Two workers in Tanzania

Scientific classification
- Kingdom: Animalia
- Phylum: Arthropoda
- Clade: Pancrustacea
- Class: Insecta
- Order: Hymenoptera
- Family: Formicidae
- Subfamily: Ponerinae
- Tribe: Ponerini
- Alliance: Plectroctena genus group
- Genus: Plectroctena; F.Smith, 1858

Type species
- Plectroctena mandibularis F.Smith, 1858

Diversity
- 17 species

Synonyms
- Cacopone Santschi, 1914

= Plectroctena =

Genus of ants

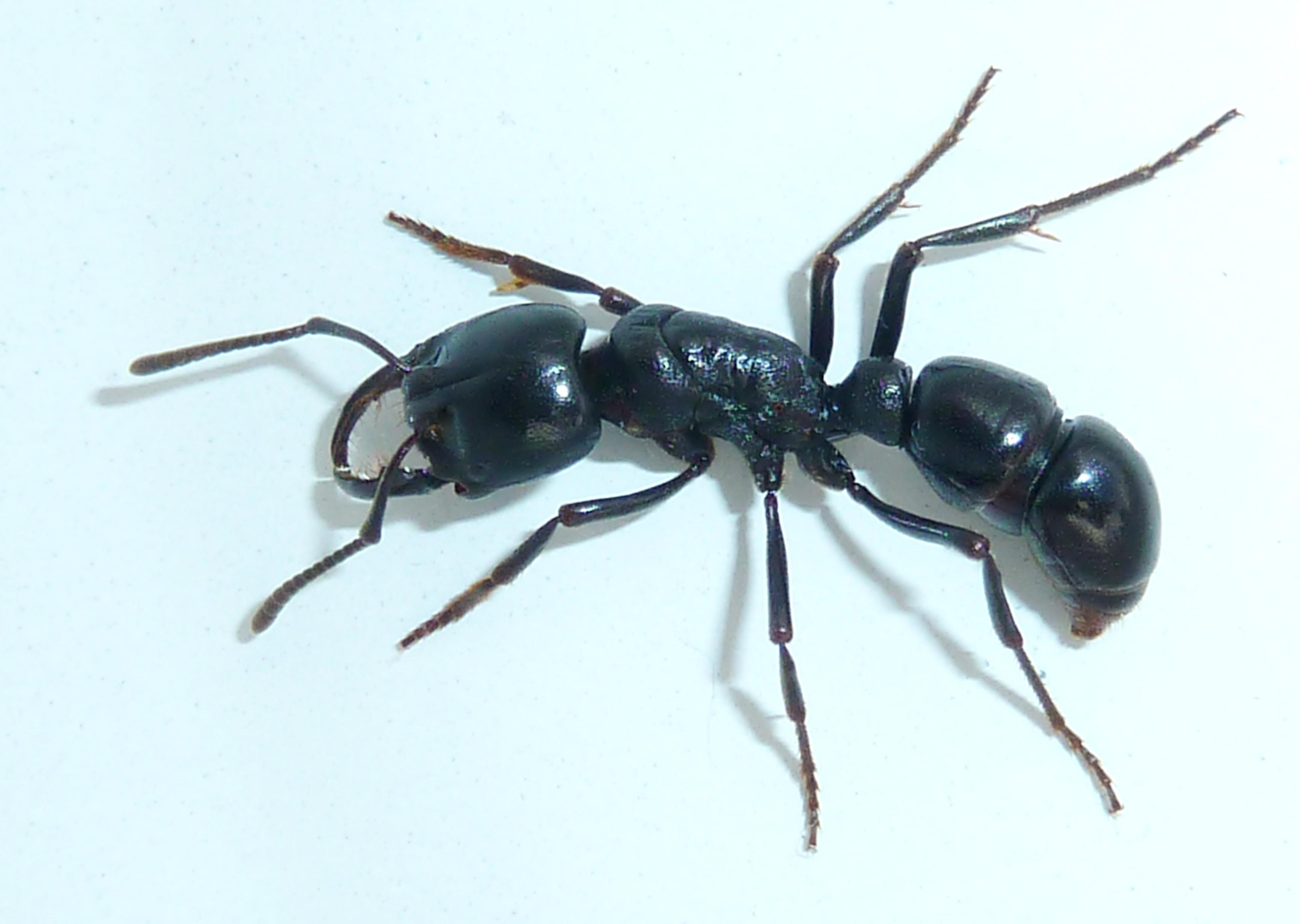
Plectroctena mandibularis

Plectroctena is an Afrotropical genus of ants, with most species occurring in the rainforest zones of West and Central Africa. Some species are cryptic or subterranean foragers, while others forage in open grassland terrain. The workers forage singly or in groups of 2 to 3. They nest in the earth at varying depths, or in collapsed logs. They prey mainly on millipedes, including their young or eggs.

== Colony structure ==
A colony of P. lygaria (a small species of the mandibularis-group) may number in excess of 300 adults. An excavated colony in the Ivory Coast consisted of 277 workers, 8 alate queens, and 42 alate males. Consequently 15% of their number was allocated to reproductives at the specific time. The colony size of P. mandibularis however, seldom exceeds 50 individuals.

== Nests ==
In a colony of P. lygaria, the nest chambers are located at shallow depth, in moist soil under dense leaf litter. The deepest chamber may be located about 7 cm below the surface, with each chamber up to 1 cm in height. The chambers are specialized to house either brood or prey items. Nests of the widespread species P. mandibularis however, are composed of chambers typically located 2 feet or more below the surface, with entrances that are usually marked by large piles of earth.

== Diet ==
It is believed that millipede eggs may at times constitute the exclusive diet of P. lygaria, while newly emerged millipede young may be an additional food source for the smaller Plectroctena species. Larger species like P. conjugata, P. mandibularis and P. minor specialize on adult millipedes.

== Species ==
- Plectroctena anops Bolton, 1974
- Plectroctena conjugata Santschi, 1914
- Plectroctena cristata Emery, 1899
- Plectroctena cryptica Bolton, 1974
- Plectroctena dentata Santschi, 1912
- Plectroctena gabonensis Santschi, 1919
- Plectroctena gestroi Menozzi, 1922
- Plectroctena hastifera (Santschi, 1914)
- Plectroctena laevior Stitz, 1924
- Plectroctena latinodis Santschi, 1924
- Plectroctena lygaria Bolton, Gotwald & Leroux, 1979
- Plectroctena macgeei Bolton, 1974
- Plectroctena mandibularis F.Smith, 1858
- Plectroctena minor Emery, 1892
- Plectroctena strigosa Emery, 1899
- Plectroctena subterranea Arnold, 1915
- Plectroctena thaui Fisher, 2006
- Plectroctena ugandensis Menozzi, 1933
