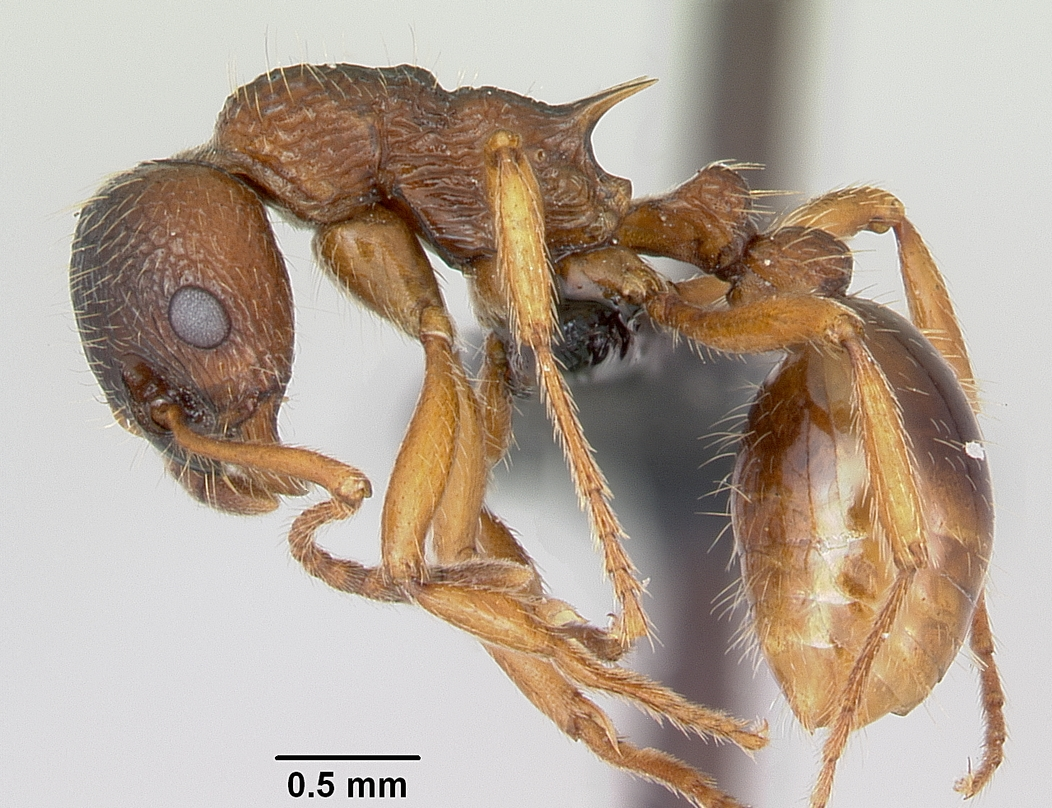

Scientific classification
- Domain: Eukaryota
- Kingdom: Animalia
- Phylum: Arthropoda
- Class: Insecta
- Order: Hymenoptera
- Family: Formicidae
- Subfamily: Myrmicinae
- Genus: Myrmica
- Species: M. ruginodis

Binomial name
- Myrmica ruginodis Nylander, 1846

= Myrmica ruginodis =

Species of ant

Myrmica ruginodis is a species of ant that lives in northern parts of Europe and Asia. It is very similar to M. rubra, but has a more northerly and higher-altitude distribution. Overwintering larvae may become either workers or queen ants, with up to 20 queens living in a colony of up to 2,500 individuals. Two subspecies are recognised, differing in the relative size of the queen.

== Description ==
Comparison of Myrmica ruginodis and M. rubra

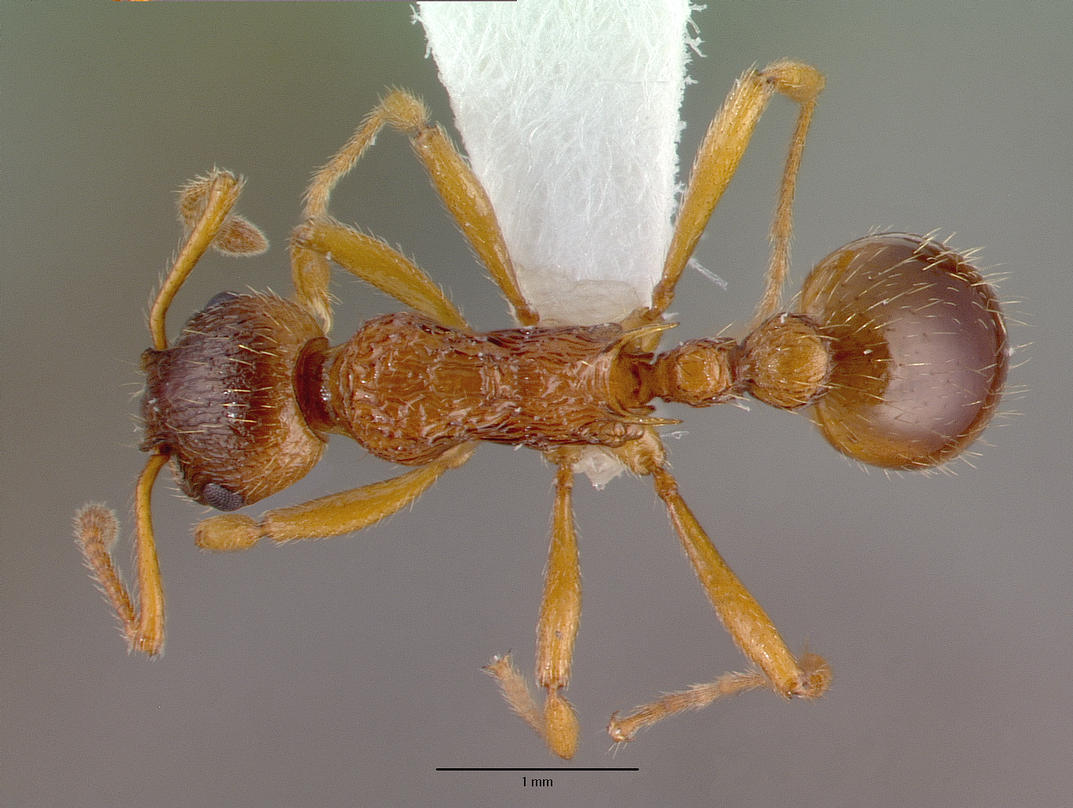
M. ruginodis worker

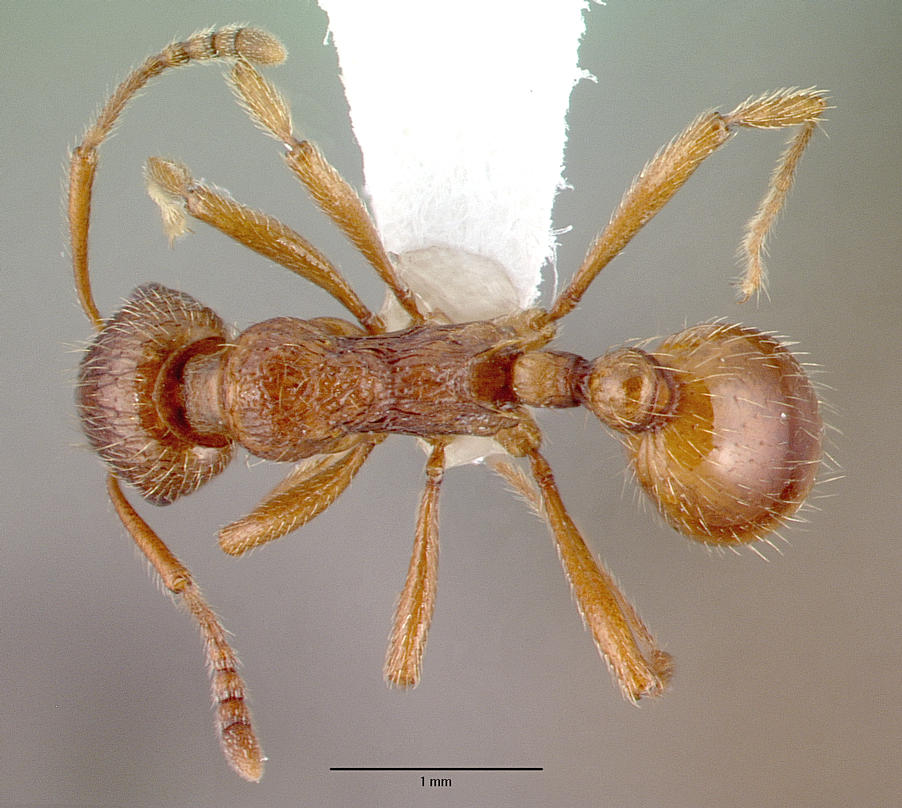
M. rubra worker

Scalebar = 1 mm

There is a close resemblance between Myrmica ruginodis and Myrmica rubra, another common species across much of Eurasia. They differ in the shape of the base of the antennae, which are curved in M. ruginodis and sharply angled in M. rubra, and in the spines projecting from the back of the thorax – in M. ruginodis, these are as long as the distance between their tips, while in M. rubra, they are shorter.

== Distribution and ecology ==
Myrmica ruginodis is found across the northern Palaearctic region, at higher altitudes and latitudes than M. rubra. Its range extends from Western Europe to Japan, and from Italy in the south to the Norwegian North Cape in the north. M. ruginodis is the only species of ant to have been recorded from all of the vice-counties into which the British Isles are divided for the purposes of biological recording, including the Channel Islands, and the only ant species present in Shetland, where it is "locally common".

It is "very abundant" in European woodland and moorland, especially above an altitude of 1,000 metres (3,300 ft), where it replaces M. rubra. The diet of M. ruginodis usually consists of small insects and other arthropods, but may also include any carcasses of birds and mammals found while foraging.

== Life cycle ==
Myrmica ruginodis overwinters as larvae. The larvae which have experienced the cold weather of a winter can develop into either workers or queens, and the specialisation into castes occurs only about a week before the end of the larval growth. A queen lays eggs throughout the spring and summer, and these larvae form two broods, with different rates of development. The fast brood develop within three months, and become workers; the slow brood take a year to develop and are the larvae which overwinter and develop into queens or workers. Each colony contains 1,200 to 2,500 individuals, including 10–20 queens. Mating flights take place in July and August.

== Taxonomic history ==
Myrmica ruginodis was first described by the Finnish biologist William Nylander in 1846. It has been divided into two subspecies, based on the size of the queens. One, M. r. macrogyna, has queens significantly larger than the workers, while the other, M. r. microgyna, has queens of a similar size to the workers. M. r. microgyna has a different distribution to M. r. macrogyna (restricted to northwestern Great Britain, for instance), and also differs from M. r. macrogyna in that the colonies also reproduce by "budding", while M. r. macrogyna only reproduces through mating flights.
