= Pleometrosis =

Behaviour in social insects

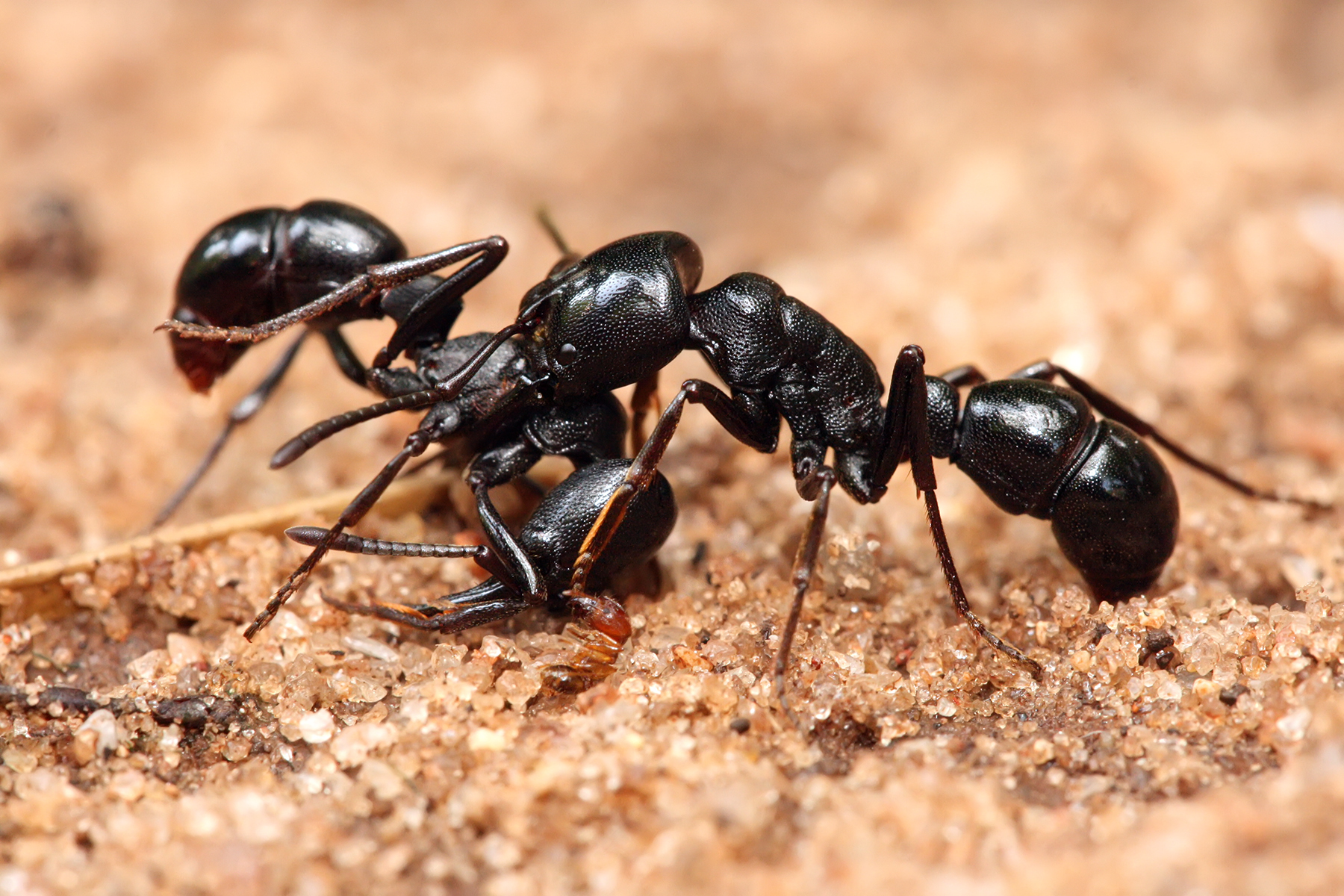
Plectroctena sp. ants

Pleometrosis is a behavior observed in social insects where colony formation is initiated by multiple queens primarily by the same species of insect. This type of behavior has been mainly studied in ants but also occurs in wasps, bees, and termites. This behavior is of significant interest to scientists particularly in ants and termites because nest formation often happens between queens that are unrelated, ruling out the argument of inclusive fitness as the driving force of pleometrosis. In contrast, co-founding queens of wasps and bees are often related. The majority of species that engage in pleometrosis after the initial stages of colony formation will reduce their colonies number of queens down to one dominant queen and either kill or push out the supernumerary queens. However there are some cases where pleometrosis-formed colonies keep multiple queens for longer than the early stages of colony growth. Multiple queens can help to speed a colony through the early stages of colony growth by producing a larger worker ant population faster which helps to out-compete other colonies in colony-dense areas. However forming colonies with multiple queens can also cause intra-colony competition between the queens possibly lowering the likelihood of survival of a queen in a pleometrotic colony.

== Selection pressures causing pleometrosis in ants ==
The driving selection pressure that causes ant species to form colonies through pleometrosis appears to be inter-colony competition in areas with high colony density. When a queen enters an area in which she wants to form a colony, there may be a finite amount of resources to fuel the colony thus necessitating intense competition and territoriality for resources between ant colonies. If the queen forms a colony on her own then she has a low probability of surviving because other colonies may be able to produce workers faster than her or may already be past the early stages of colony formation. Forming the colony on her own could also cause her to have to forage for food to out-compete other colonies through number of offspring. This foraging behavior puts her at risk of predators. However, if she and multiple queens form a colony through pleometrosis they can produce a larger worker force of ants faster and get to a mature reproductive stage of colony growth faster, thus decreasing the chances of death due to inter-colony competition. It has been observed that ants which form pleometrotic colonies engage in less foraging behavior, thus lowering their chance of predation. Having multiple queens cuts down on foraging behavior because each queen uses her own stored energy reserves to feed the brood. By founding the colony pleometrotically ants can form new colonies in high colony density areas and take control of resources in the surrounding area faster. Some genera of ants such as Azteca use the additional worker ants early in the colonies formation to monopolize and take control of resources in close proximity of the colony thus stopping other con-specific colonies from acquiring those resources. This strategy allows the pleometrotic colonies to monopolize the area and starve out competing colonies. The additional worker force in pleometrotic colonies also allows for bigger and more effective brood raids on con-specific colonies which additionally helps to out-compete colonies. A key aspect of founding a colony in a high density colony area is being able to produce a worker force quickly and efficiently so as to not be starved out or robbed of brood from other colonies causing starvation. By engaging in pleometrosis queens increase their chance of survival past the early stages of colony formation due to the increased worker force produced by multiple reproductive individuals. The colony can better control its surrounding resources and effectively compete with other colonies.

== Costs and benefits of pleometrosis ==
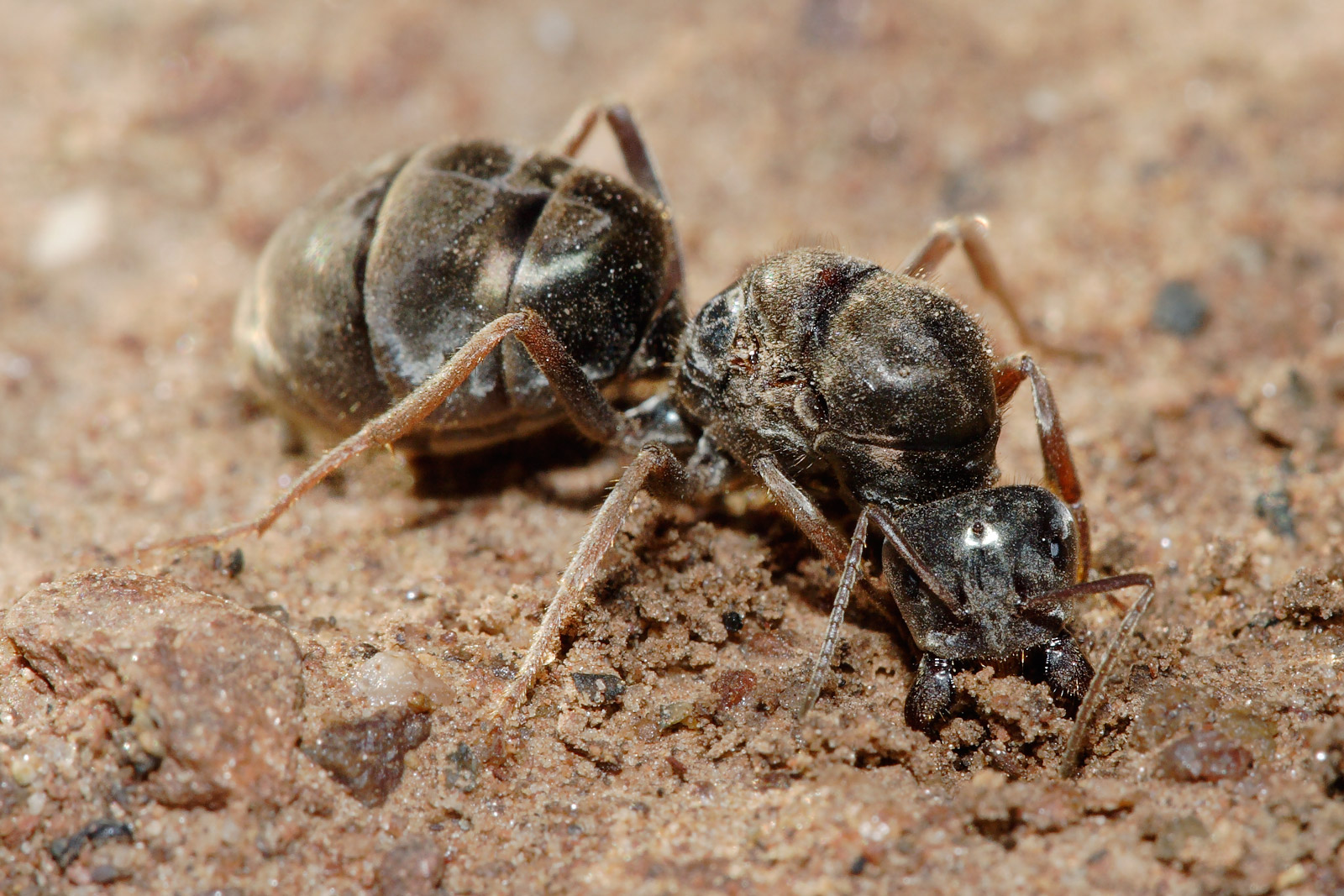
Ant queen creating hole for colony formation

Pleometrosis is necessary to survive inter-colony competition in high-density and resource-limited areas but the majority of pleometrotic colonies cut back to one queen before the reproductive stages of colony growth. So this suggests that a queen has a better chance of surviving and reproducing offspring if she forms a colony with other queens even though eventually she may be pushed out or killed by intra-colony competition. The risk of being out-competed by a con-specific queen within one's own colony must be less than the risk of dying out due to other insect colonies. So in high density colony areas or resource-limited areas where inter-colony competition is high, selection for pleometrosis is higher because the chance of survival in a pleometrotic colony is greater. As the number of queens in a pleometrotic colony increases, the chances of each queen becoming the dominant queen in the colony lowers, but still selection pressures choose pleometrosis over haplometrosis. Depending on the species of ant and the selection pressures of the colony there are multiple ways a queen can become the one dominant queen in the colony and gain the full benefit of a pleometrotic colony. The queens that normally come out as dominant in pleometrotic colonies lay more eggs, have well-developed ovaries, and do not engage in foraging behavior. Worker ants even play a role in deciding whether a queen will become the dominant individual in some species by feeding the queen who is the most fertile more than other queens in the nest. Queens will also engage in dominance actions to assert dominance over the nest such as brood cannibalism of other queens' brood. When the most fertile queen in the nest decides to directly challenge another queen, it is usually the initiating queen that wins and takes control of the colony, turning it into a one queen colony. The benefits of pleometrosis is certain situations outweigh the costs for queens, regardless of the intra-colony competition it causes. Thus it has evolved to occur in high density areas of inter-colony competition.

== Colony foundation by pleometrosis in Azteca ants ==
Azteca ants form colonies in the internodes of Cecropia trees which are native to Mexico and South America. The tree provides the ants with food and shelter and the ants protect the tree from other insects thus engaging in a mutualistic relationship. Queens form colonies by burrowing into the inter node of the tree and then sealing off the entrance hole with parenchyma cells, after which they begin to lay eggs to produce the first brood. Any queens which decide to engage in pleometrosis can easily see the filled in hole and will chew through it quickly and join the fellow queen in the inter node. Colonies that are formed in these trees try to out-compete other colonies by monopolizing the resources of a tree first. By forming a pleometrotic colony in a Cecropia tree the queens can produce workers faster and take control of the resources in the tree first thus out-competing other colonies. However, the social interactions between queens in a pleometrotic colony differ depending on the species of Azteca. In Azteca xanthochroa which are more aggressive, pleometrotic colonies work together to produce a greater number of workers at the start of colony formation but once the colony breaks out of the inter node of the tree the interactions between the queens change. Once this step occurs queens will try to kill each other to become the dominant queen in the colony and switch the colony to a single queen colony. However in species of A. constructor which are less aggressive, once the worker ants leave the inter node to take control of the tree's resources, multiple queens remain cooperative with each other for up to a year. Hypothesizes as to why A. constructor colonies engage in cooperative breeding with multiple queens could be due to similarities in A. constructor queens fighting abilities or the inclusive fitness benefits in some colonies of A. constructor. In contrast pleometrotic colonies of A. xanthochroa form and change to one queen colonies after the early stages of colony formation. There are also examples of pleometrotic colonies forming with multiple species of Azteca, however, when these form the more aggressive species will out-compete and kill off the other queens in the colony once the early stages of formation have passed. Mixed species pleometrosis is rare but helps to support the fact that the majority of social insects who form pleometrotic colonies do not do so for kin selection-related benefits, but to be able to out-compete other colonies in the early stages of development.
