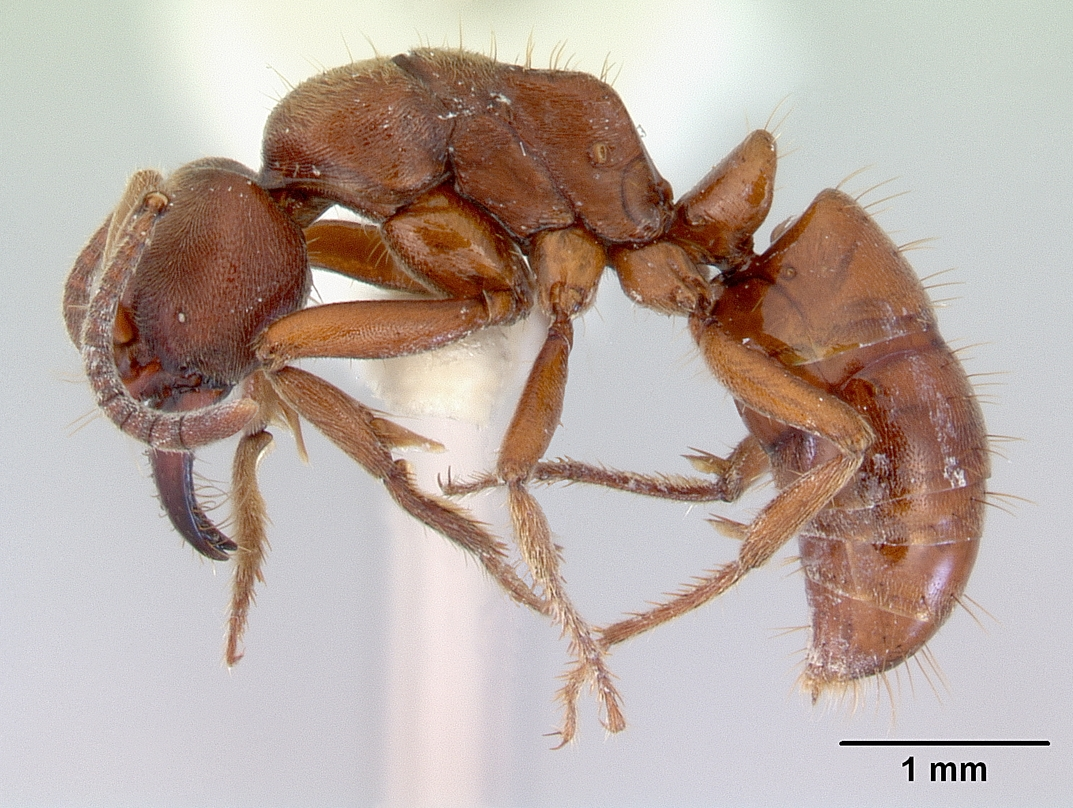
- Buniapone amblyops worker, holotype specimen

Scientific classification
- Kingdom: Animalia
- Phylum: Arthropoda
- Class: Insecta
- Order: Hymenoptera
- Family: Formicidae
- Subfamily: Ponerinae
- Tribe: Ponerini
- Genus: Buniapone; Schmidt & Shattuck, 2014
- Species: B. amblyops

Binomial name
- Buniapone amblyops (Emery, 1887)

Synonyms
- Ponera amblyops Emery, 1887 (type species of Buniapone)

= Buniapone =

Genus of ants

Buniapone is a monotypic genus of ants in the subfamily Ponerinae. Buniapone amblyops, the single described species, is found in Southern and Southeast Asia.

== Etymology ==
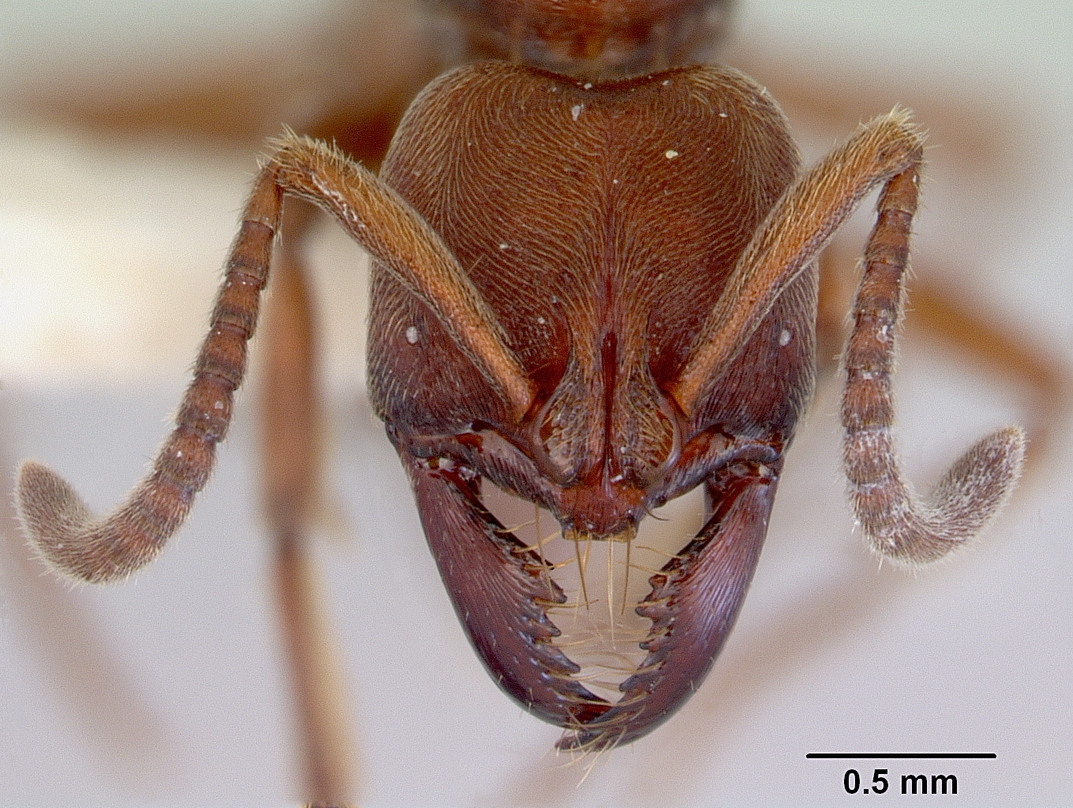
Head view of a Buniapone amblyops worker

The genus name is derived from orang bunian, supernatural forest-living beings in Malay folklore, with the suffix -pone from the name of subfamily.

== Taxonomy ==
The genus was established by Schmidt & Shattuck (2014) to house the single species Ponera amblyops (at the time a junior synonym Pachycondyla amblyops), which was first described by Emery (1887) from worker specimen from the Indonesian island of Sumatra. The type species has a long and complicated taxonomic history, variously belonging to the genera Ponera, Trapeziopelta (now Myopias), Belonopelta, Pachycondyla, Pseudoponera, Euponera and Pachycondyla. One subspecies, B. amblyops oculatior from Indonesia, has been described. Molecular phylogeny by Schmidt (2013) resolved Buniapone as a sister to the strictly African genus Paltothyreus.

== Distribution ==
The genus is distributed in Southern and Southeast Asia, from China to Indonesia and India.

== Description ==
Little is known about their biology, but they have a subterranean lifestyle and are thought to be predators, although not strictly carnivorous. Workers are medium in size (5.5–6.5 mm), orange-colored, and have long and narrow mandibles with seven teeth. Queens are similar to the workers, but larger (9.25 mm). Buniapone is morphologically similar to some Cryptopone and Promyopias species. However, Buniapone is more closely related to other species and the similarities are deemed to have evolved through convergent evolution.
