= Gamergate (disambiguation) =

Gamergate was a loosely organized misogynistic online harassment campaign.

Gamergate may also refer to:

- Gamergate (ant), a worker ant that can store sperm and reproduce sexually
- Lt. Gamergate, a character in the Adventure Time episode "Dentist"

== See also ==
- GamersGate, a Sweden-based online video game store
