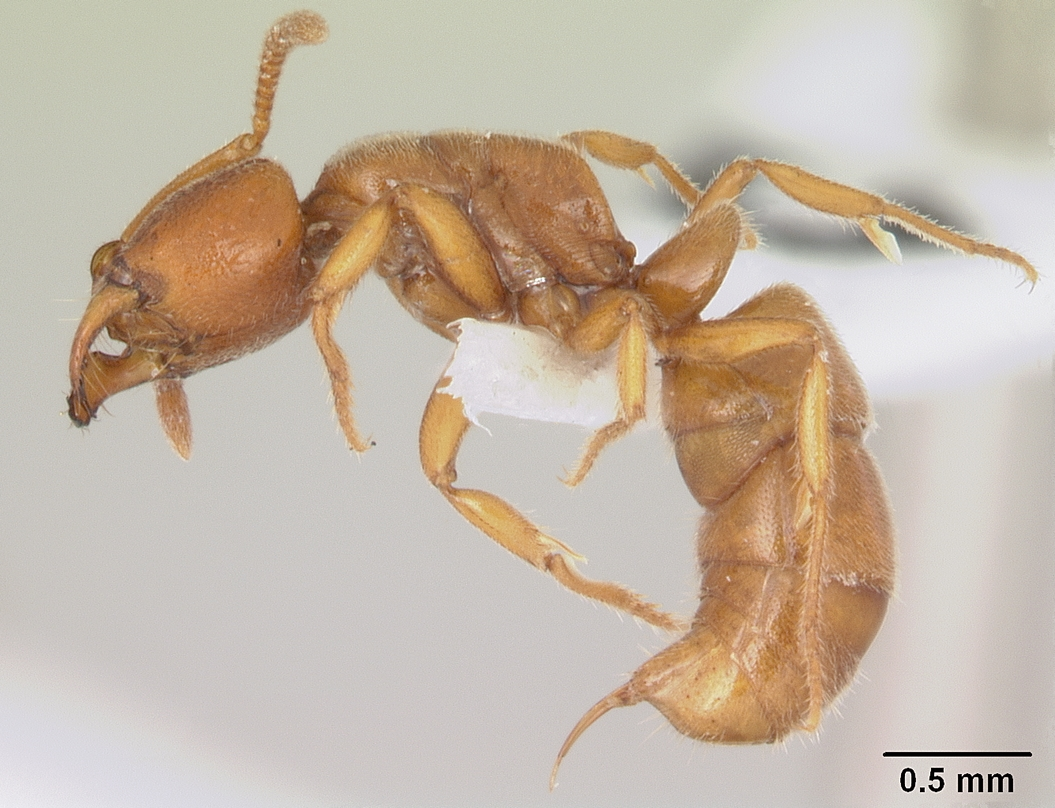
- A worker specimen from AntWeb

Scientific classification
- Kingdom: Animalia
- Phylum: Arthropoda
- Class: Insecta
- Order: Hymenoptera
- Family: Formicidae
- Subfamily: Ponerinae
- Tribe: Ponerini
- Genus: Sritoponera
- Species: S. suspecta

Binomial name
- Sritoponera suspecta (Santschi, 1914)

= Sritoponera =

Genus of ants

Sritoponera is a monotypic genus of ponerine ants described in 2025 containing the sole species Sritoponera suspecta found in the Afrotropics. S. suspecta was previously placed in the genus Parvaponera by Fisher & Bolton in 2016. Its scientific name means "small wicked ant" from ancient Egyptian srit + ancient Greek ponēra.
