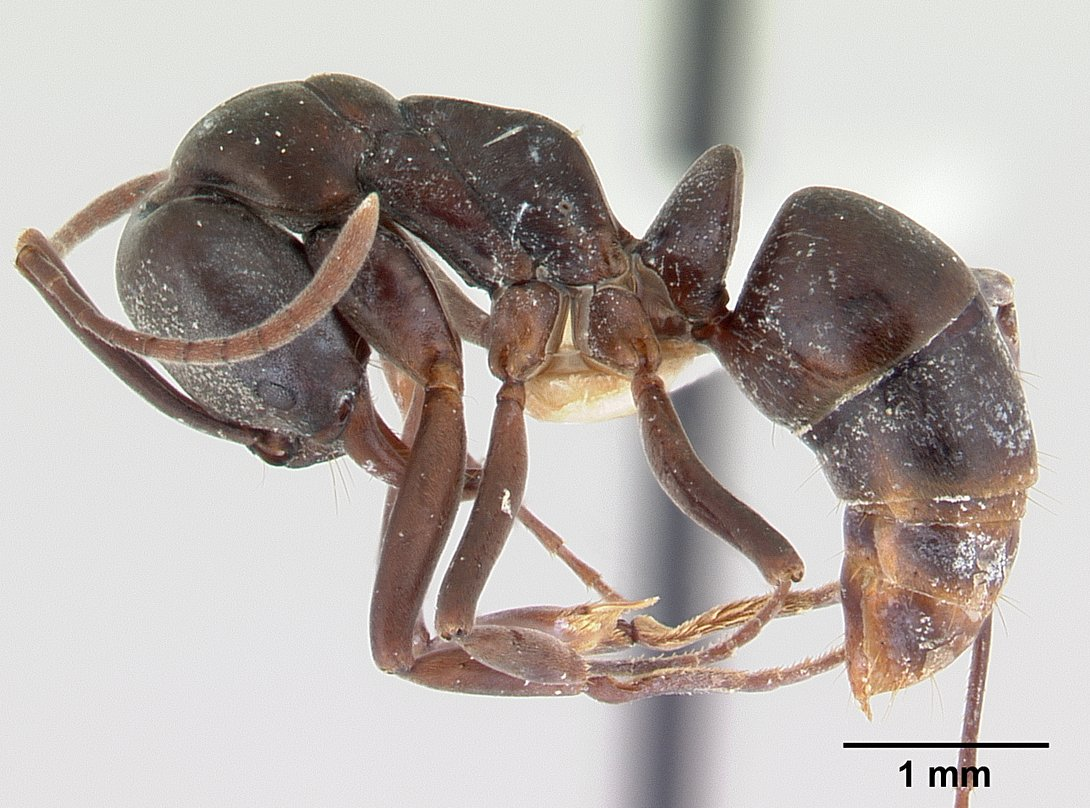
- Mesoponera melanaria worker

Scientific classification
- Kingdom: Animalia
- Phylum: Arthropoda
- Clade: Pancrustacea
- Class: Insecta
- Order: Hymenoptera
- Family: Formicidae
- Genus: Mesoponera
- Species: M. melanaria

Binomial name
- Mesoponera melanaria (Emery, 1893)

= Mesoponera melanaria =

Species of ant

Mesoponera melanaria, is a species of ant of the subfamily Ponerinae. Two subspecies are recognized.

== Subspecies ==
- Mesoponera melanaria macra Emery, 1894 - Seychelles
- Mesoponera melanaria melanaria(Emery, 1893) - Seychelles, India, Sri Lanka, China
