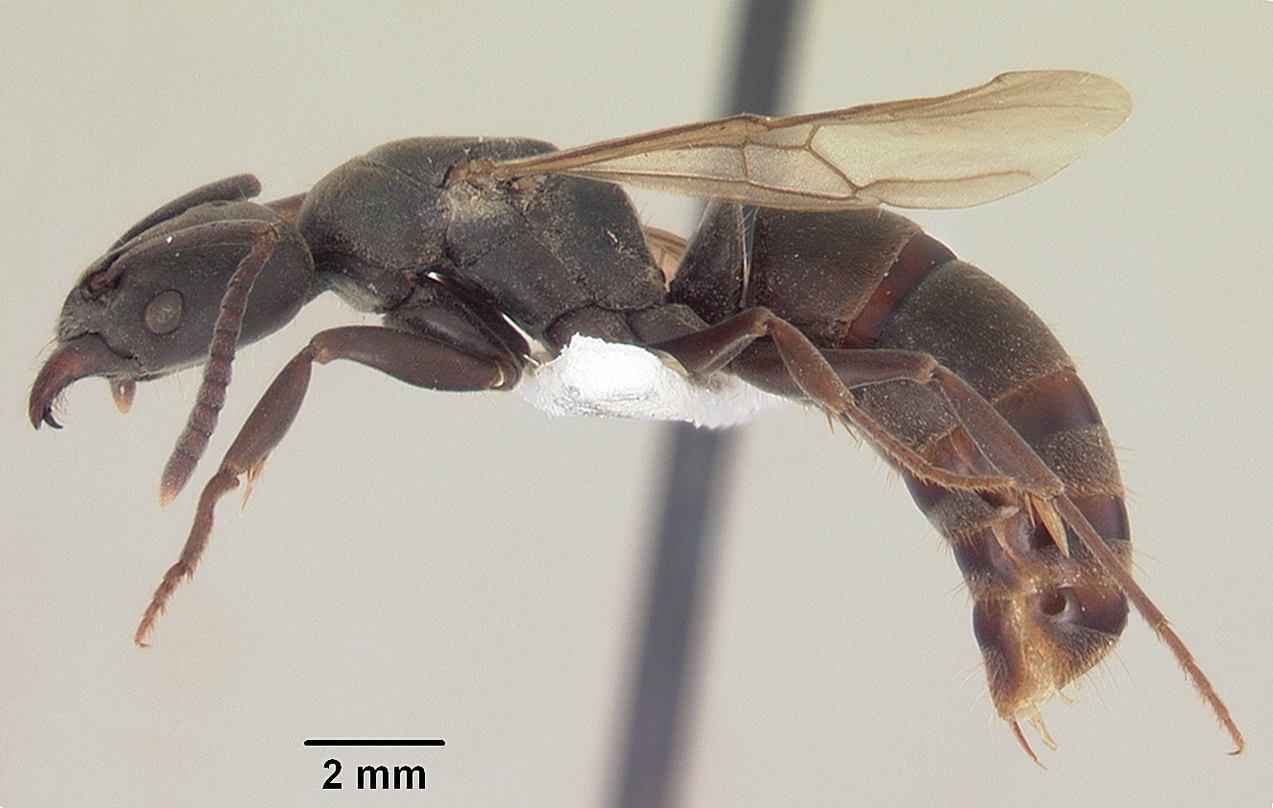
- Makebapone caffraria queen specimen from AntWeb

Scientific classification
- Kingdom: Animalia
- Phylum: Arthropoda
- Clade: Pancrustacea
- Class: Insecta
- Order: Hymenoptera
- Family: Formicidae
- Subfamily: Ponerinae
- Tribe: Ponerini
- Alliance: Odontomachus genus group
- Genus: Makebapone; Fisher et al. 2025

Type species
- Ponera caffraria Smith, 1858

Diversity
- 2 species

= Makebapone =

Genus of ants

Makebapone is a genus of ponerine ants containing two species found in the Afrotropics. Described in 2025, its species were previously placed in the genus Mesoponera by Schmidt & Shattuck in 2014. It is named after the South African singer Miriam Makeba, and its grammatical gender is feminine. Its appearance is generally similar to that of Mesoponera, except for a few differences like a shorter masticatory margin with low teeth, a broadly rounded and inflated clypeus, a slit-shaped propodeal spiracle, an evenly convex subpetiolar process, and a short and downturned prora.

== Species ==
Makebapone contains two valid species as of 2025.

- Makebapone caffraria (Smith, 1858)
- Makebapone ingesta (Wheeler, 1922)

== See also ==
- List of organisms named after famous people (born 1925–1949)
