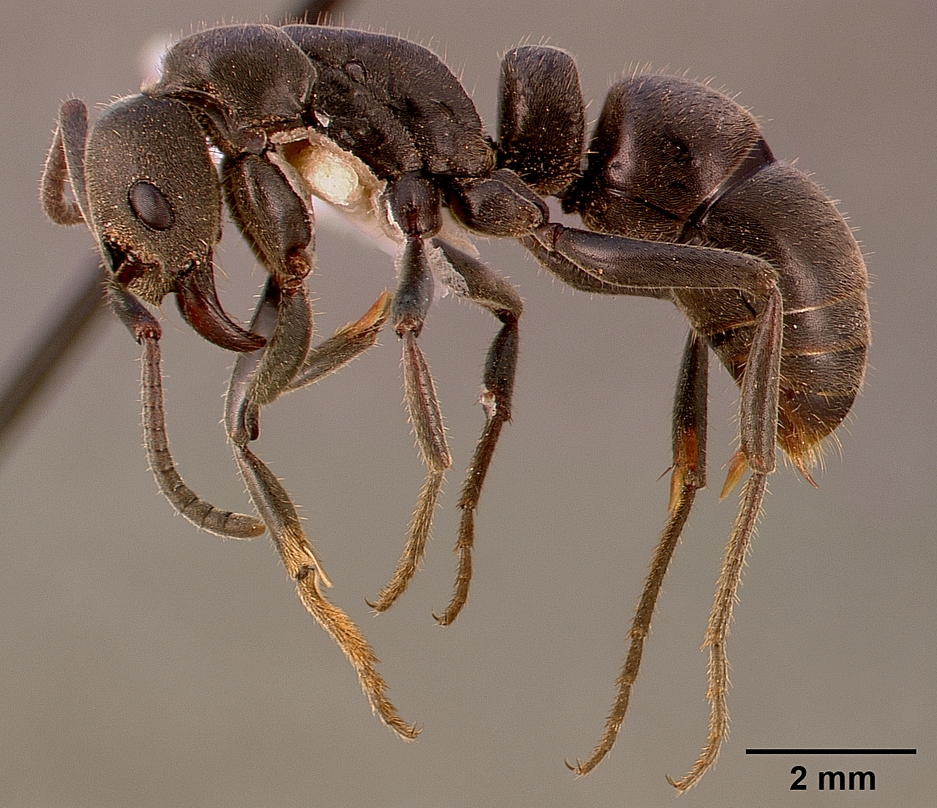
- Boltonopone kruegeri worker specimen from AntWeb

Scientific classification
- Kingdom: Animalia
- Phylum: Arthropoda
- Class: Insecta
- Order: Hymenoptera
- Family: Formicidae
- Subfamily: Ponerinae
- Tribe: Ponerini
- Alliance: Odontomachus genus group
- Genus: Boltonopone; Fisher et al. 2025

Type species
- Ponera sulcata Mayr, 1867

Diversity
- 17 species

= Boltonopone =

Genus of ants

Boltonopone is a genus of ponerine ants containing 16 species found in the Old World tropics, from sub-Saharan Africa to Southeast Asia. Described in 2025, its species were previously placed in the genus Bothroponera by Schmidt & Shattuck in 2014. It is named after myrmecologist Barry Bolton.

== Species ==
Boltonopone contains 17 valid species as of 2025.

- Boltonopone ancilla (Emery, 1899)
- Boltonopone crassa (Emery, 1877)
- Boltonopone escherischi (Forel, 1910)
- Boltonopone glabripes (Emery, 1893)
- Boltonopone henryi (Donisthorpe, 1942)
- Boltonopone ilgii (Forel, 1910)
- Boltonopone kruegeri (Forel, 1910)
- Boltonopone notaula (Joma & Mackay, 2017)
- Boltonopone picardi (Forel, 1901)
- Boltonopone pilosuperficia (Joma & Mackay, 2017)
- Boltonopone rubiginosa (Emery, 1889)
- Boltonopone ryderae (Joma & Mackay, 2017)
- Boltonopone silvestrii (Santschi, 1914)
- Boltonopone soror (Emery, 1899)
- Boltonopone sulcata (Mayr, 1867)
- Boltonopone tesseronoda (Emery, 1877)
- Boltonopone williamsi (Wheeler, W.M. & Chapman, 1925)
