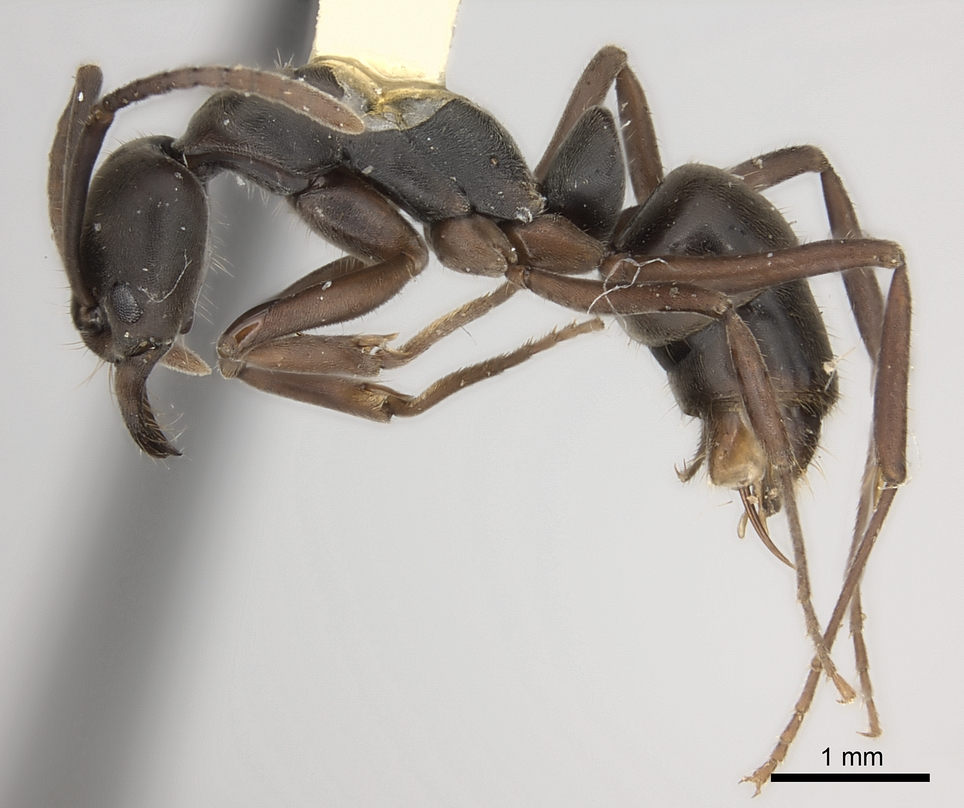
- Mayaponera constricta worker

Scientific classification
- Kingdom: Animalia
- Phylum: Arthropoda
- Class: Insecta
- Order: Hymenoptera
- Family: Formicidae
- Genus: Mayaponera
- Species: M. constricta

Binomial name
- Mayaponera constricta (Mayr, 1884)

Synonyms
- Ponera constricta Mayr, 1884

= Mayaponera constricta =

Species of ant

Mayaponera constricta is a species of ant in the subfamily Ponerinae, found in Central and South America. Workers are slender and medium in size (6–7.5 mm).
