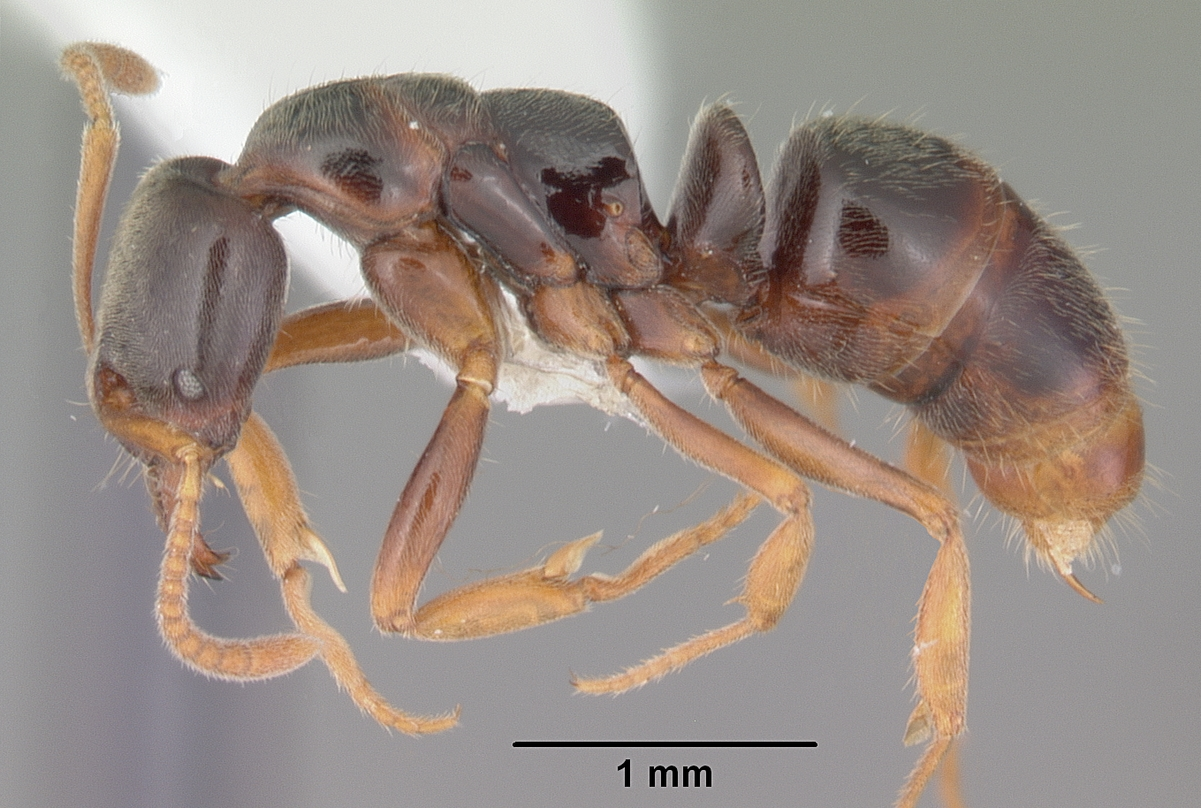
- Xiphopelta elisae worker specimen from AntWeb

Scientific classification
- Kingdom: Animalia
- Phylum: Arthropoda
- Clade: Pancrustacea
- Class: Insecta
- Order: Hymenoptera
- Family: Formicidae
- Subfamily: Ponerinae
- Tribe: Ponerini
- Alliance: Odontomachus genus group
- Genus: Xiphopelta; Forel, 1913

Type species
- Ponera arnoldi, now Xiphopelta elisae rotundi Forel, 1913

Diversity
- 11 species

= Xiphopelta =

Genus of ants

Xiphopelta is a genus of ponerine ants containing 11 species found in the Afrotropics. Described as a subgenus in 1913, synonymized in 1973, and revalidated to full generic status by Fisher et al. in 2025, its species were previously placed in the genus Mesoponera by Schmidt & Shattuck in 2014. Its scientific name means "sword-shielded ant" from ancient Greek xíphos + péltā.

== Species ==
Xiphopelta contains 11 valid species as of 2025.

- Xiphopelta ambigua (André, 1890)
- Xiphopelta elisae (Forel, 1891)
- Xiphopelta flavopilosa (Weber, 1942)
- Xiphopelta nimba (Bernard, 1953)
- Xiphopelta novemdentata (Bernard, 1953)
- Xiphopelta picea (Bernard, 1953)
- Xiphopelta scolopax (Emery, 1899)
- Xiphopelta senegalensis (Santschi, 1914)
- Xiphopelta testacea (Bernard, 1953)
- Xiphopelta villiersi (Bernard, 1953)
- Xiphopelta weberi (Bernard, 1953)
