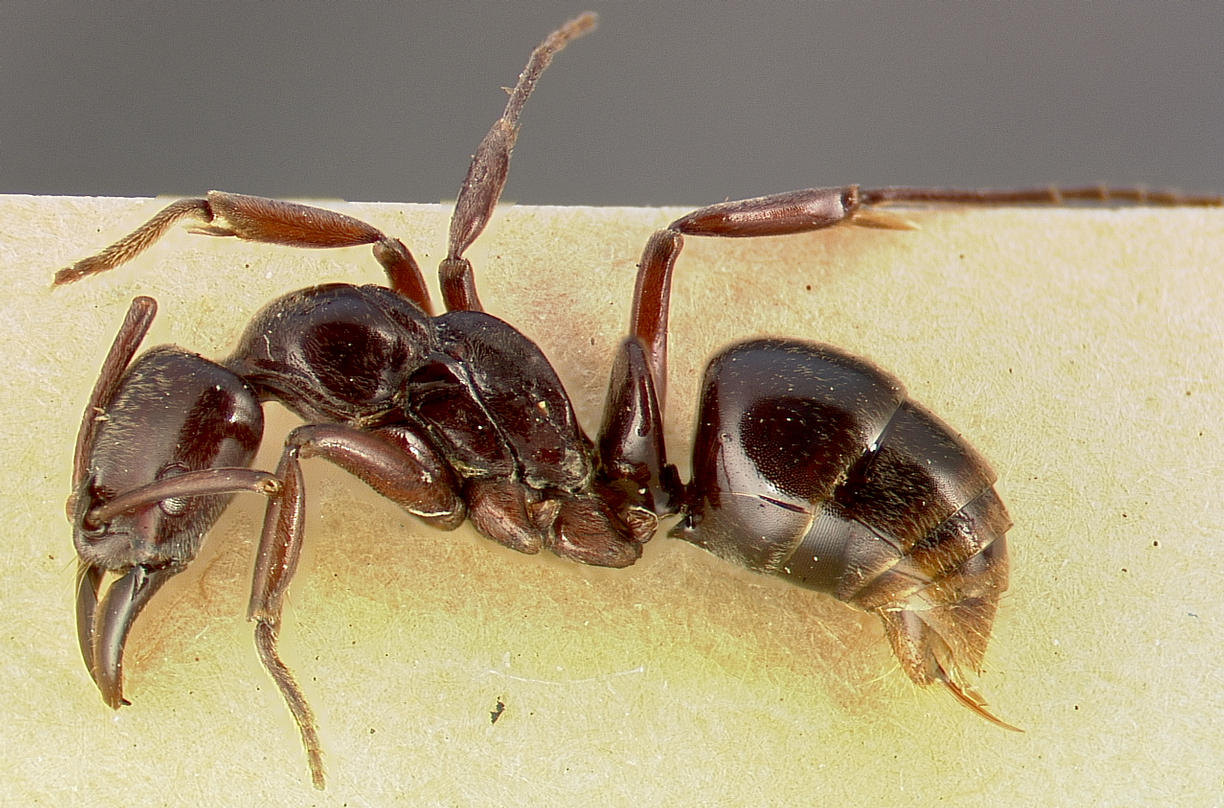
- A worker specimen from AntWeb

Scientific classification
- Kingdom: Animalia
- Phylum: Arthropoda
- Class: Insecta
- Order: Hymenoptera
- Family: Formicidae
- Subfamily: Ponerinae
- Tribe: Ponerini
- Genus: Subiridopone; Fisher et al., 2025
- Species: S. subiridescens

Binomial name
- Subiridopone subiridescens (Wheeler, 1922)

= Subiridopone =

Genus of ants

Subiridopone is a monotypic genus of ponerine ants described in 2025 containing the sole species Subiridopone subiridescens found in the Afrotropics. S. subiridescens was previously placed in the genus Mesoponera by Schmidt & Shattuck in 2014. Its scientific name means "slightly iridescent wicked ant" from sub + Latin irid + ancient Greek ponēra.
