= Gamergate (ant) =

Reproductively viable female worker ant

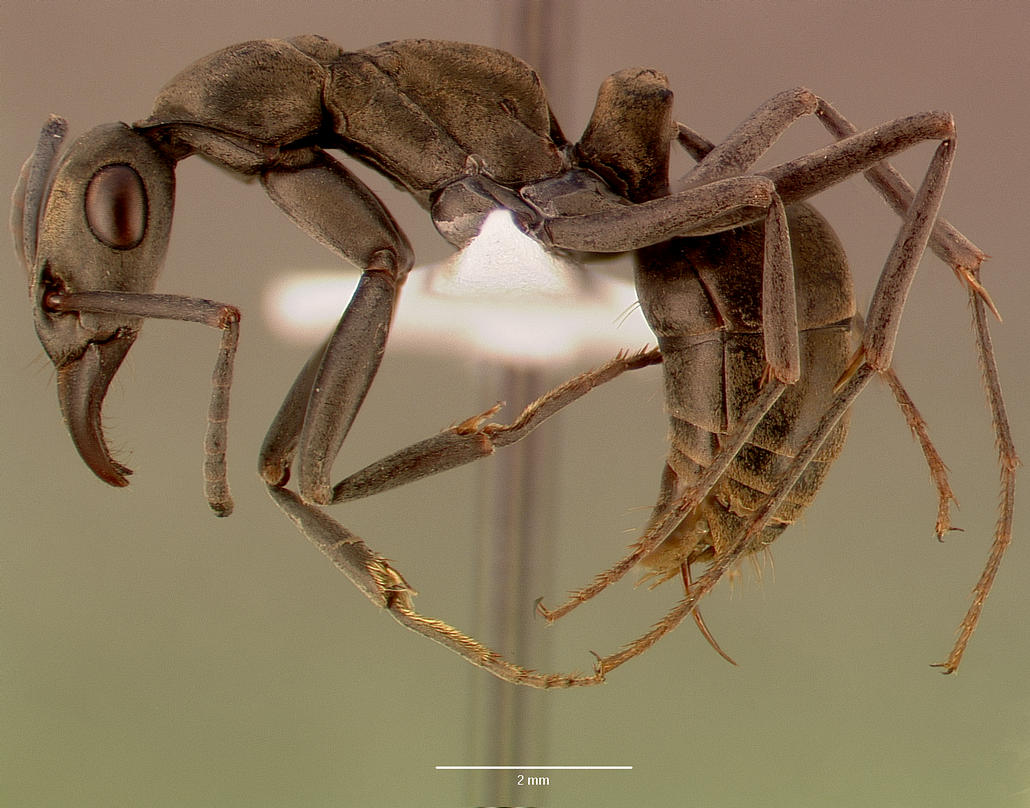
Lateral view of an Ophthalmopone berthoudi worker, the ant for which the term gamergate was originally coined (Note: In the original Naturwissenschaften paper where the term "gamergate" was first used, O. berthoudi is referred to by the synonym Pachycondyla berthoudi.)

A gamergate (/ˈɡæmərˌɡeɪt/ GAM-ər-gayt) is a mated worker ant that can reproduce sexually, i.e., lay fertilized eggs that will develop as females. In the vast majority of ant species, workers are sterile and gamergates are restricted to taxa where the workers have a functional sperm reservoir ('spermatheca'). In some species, gamergates reproduce in addition to winged queens (usually upon the death of the original foundress), while in other species the queen caste has been completely replaced by gamergates. In gamergate species, all workers in a colony have similar reproductive potentials, but as a result of physical interactions, a dominance hierarchy is formed and only one or a few top-ranking workers can mate (usually with foreign males) and produce eggs. Subsequently, however, aggression is no longer needed as gamergates secrete chemical signals that inform the other workers of their reproductive status in the colony.

Depending on the species, there can be one gamergate per colony (monogyny) or several gamergates (polygyny). Most gamergate species have colonies with a few hundred or fewer workers.

== Etymology ==
Gamergate derives from the Greek words γάμος (gámos) and ἐργάτης (ergátēs) and means 'married worker'. It was coined in 1983 by geneticist William Louis Brown and was first used in scientific literature by entomologists Christian Peeters and Robin Crewe in a 1984 paper published in Naturwissenschaften. The definition typically found in entomological dictionaries is 'mated, egg-laying worker', and is drawn from the glossary of Bert Hölldobler and E. O. Wilson's 1990 book, The Ants.

== Description ==
There are 100–200 different species in which gamergates reproduce (roughly 1% of all ants), most of which fall within the poneromorph subfamilies. Whereas workers (which are all females) in most ant species are morphologically incapable of storing sperm, in gamergate species one or several workers mate and have active ovaries. Gamergate lifespan is short compared to queens in queenright colonies, but gamergates can be replaced by other dominant workers in the colony without risking colony survival. Reproductive investment in gamergate females is thus optimized because non-differentiated gamergates (i.e. reproductively inactive workers) function as laborers.

=== Caste structure ===
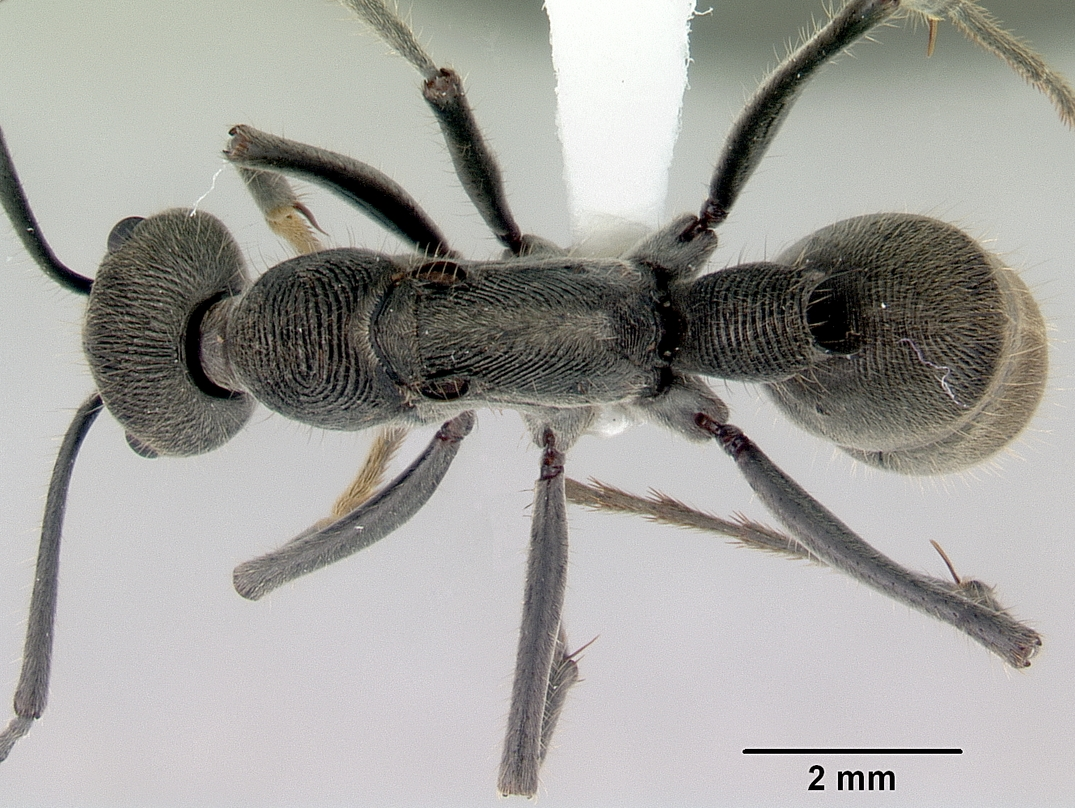
Dorsal view of a nonreproductive female Diacamma australe worker, lacking anterior thoracic gemmae (buds)

Within gamergate colonies, all workers are born reproductively viable and are thus potential gamergates. Prior to differentiation as a gamergate, a dominant worker must physically inhibit its sisters. For example, in the case of Diacamma australe, the first female to become reproductively active will clip off the thoracic gemmae of her sisters, thus greatly reducing their sexual attractiveness. In other genera, persistent domination of worker females by gamergates via physical aggression all but ensure that they will not produce male offspring. In Diacamma nilgiri, gamergates use dominance interactions to monopolize reproduction without mutilation of sister workers. The same is true for Streblognathus peetersi, which engage in non-injurious aggression to determine dominance. For most gamergate species, the start of ovarian activity eliminates the need to physically dominate nestmate workers. Instead newly produced pheromones or signaling chemicals ensure that workers remain nonreproductive. Although it is unknown to what degree these chemicals act as pheromones or as signals, support for the signaling hypothesis can be found in the loss of reproductive inhibition of workers as the gamergate grows older and her fecundity diminishes.

Mechanisms of gamergate replacement vary among monogynous and polygynous species. When a gamergate dies, it is usually replaced by a formerly submissive worker who proceeds to mate and begins ovarian activity. A new gamergate often originates from a younger cohort. For example, when the original founding queen dies in a Harpegnathos saltator colony, younger workers begin to fight for dominance and some become the next reproductives. Because reproductively inactive workers are able to activate their ovaries after the death of the gamergate, some gamergate species can be considered cooperative breeders rather than truly eusocial insects.

In colonies with both queens and gamergates, the latter function as secondary reproductives. Research on Amblyoponinae species has shown that there is a fecundity-based hierarchy among gamergates. In Stigmatomma reclinatum, it was found that higher-ranked gamergates had more fully developed oocytes than low-ranked gamergates. In Streblognathus peetersi, only the alpha worker mates and becomes the gamergate; younger workers await a chance to reproduce when the current gamergate exhibits decreased fecundity or dies. Challenges to gamergates from subordinate workers are risky because the gamergate in species like Dinoponera quadriceps may mark the challenger by rubbing special chemicals produced only by the gamergate. These chemicals signal to other workers to immobilize the challenger by biting her appendages and immobilizing her for a few days until her hormonal levels return to normal. Subordinate workers play an important policing role in the selection of future gamergates and are thus able to increase their indirect fitness.

=== Social structure variation and ecology ===
There is much variation in the social structure of ant colonies with gamergates. Some species such as Harpegnathos saltator, Pseudoneoponera tridentata, Gnamptogenys menadensis, and Rhytidoponera confusa have a winged alate queen caste as well as gamergates. Queenless species with only gamergates and workers may have a monogynous structure with a single gamergate or they may have a polygynous structure with multiple gamergates. Examples of monogynous queenless species include Pachycondyla krugeri, P. sublaevis, Diacamma australe, D. rugosum, Dinoponera quadriceps, Platythyrea lamellosa, and Streblognathus aethiopicus. Examples of polygynous queenless species include Ophthalmopone berthoudi, O. hottentota, and all known queenless species of Rhytidoponera. In the queenless Ophthalmopone berthoudi, foreign males visit underground nests to mate with young workers.

Ecologically, gamergate species from different tribes and genera often tend to share certain characteristics. Many gamergate species are solitary generalist foragers living in arid environments. Similar to species with ergatoid queens, the evolution of gamergate reproduction is hypothesized to be associated with a shift to colonial fission. Myrmecologists Christian Peeters and Fuminori Ito have also suggested that "the evolution of gamergate reproduction appears strongly associated with the adaptive benefits of secondary polygyny (e.g. increased colony lifespan and resource inheritance), and it is the preferred option in species having workers able to store sperm."

== Classification dispute ==
The utility of gamergate as a morphological designation is not without critics. Within the field of myrmecology it is a matter of dispute whether caste should be defined primarily by reproductive role or by physical morphology. Notably, Alfred Buschinger has argued that the term worker should be applied only to those ants who make up the non-reproductive caste and queen should be applied only to reproductively viable female ants regardless of their physical appearance. Hölldobler and Wilson suggest that the two positions can be semantically resolved and that the most fruitful approach would be to keep classification "somewhat loose, incorporating either anatomy or roles in a manner that maximizes convenience, precision, and clarity of expression."

== Genera with gamergates ==
The existence of gamergates is symplesiomorphic, or ancestral, in ants. They are known to be present in the following genera:

- Poneromorph subfamilies
  - Amblyoponinae
    - Stigmatomma (Note: Throughout Ito's 1993 paper for the Journal of Natural History, he refers not to Stigmatomma but to Amblyopone. At the time Stigmatomma was considered to be a synonym of Amblyopone.)
  - Ectatomminae
    - Gnamptogenys
    - Rhytidoponera
  - Ponerinae
    - Bothroponera
    - Diacamma
    - Dinoponera
    - Euponera
    - Hagensia
    - Harpegnathos
    - Leptogenys
    - Ophthalmopone
    - Platythyrea
    - Pseudoneoponera
    - Streblognathus
    - Thaumatomyrmex
- Myrmeciinae

- Myrmecia

- Myrmicinae

- Metapone

== See also ==
- Laying worker bee
- Mermithergate
- Parthenogenetic reproduction in insects
- Worker policing
