= Ophthalmopone =

Scientific classification
- Kingdom: Animalia
- Phylum: Arthropoda
- Class: Insecta
- Order: Hymenoptera
- Family: Formicidae
- Subfamily: Ponerinae
- Tribe: Ponerini
- Alliance: Odontomachus genus group
- Genus: Ophthalmopone; Forel, 1890

Type species
- Ophthalmopone berthoudi Forel, 1890

Diversity
- 5 species

Genus of ants

Ophthalmopone is a ponerine genus of ants found in Sub-Saharan Africa. Workers are slender and large in size (8–13.5 mm). Queens seem to be absent, but gamergates (reproductive female workers) present.

== Species ==
- Ophthalmopone berthoudi Forel, 1890
- Ophthalmopone depilis Emery, 1902
- Ophthalmopone hottentota (Emery, 1886)
- Ophthalmopone ilgii Forel, 1894
- Ophthalmopone mocquerysi Emery, 1902
