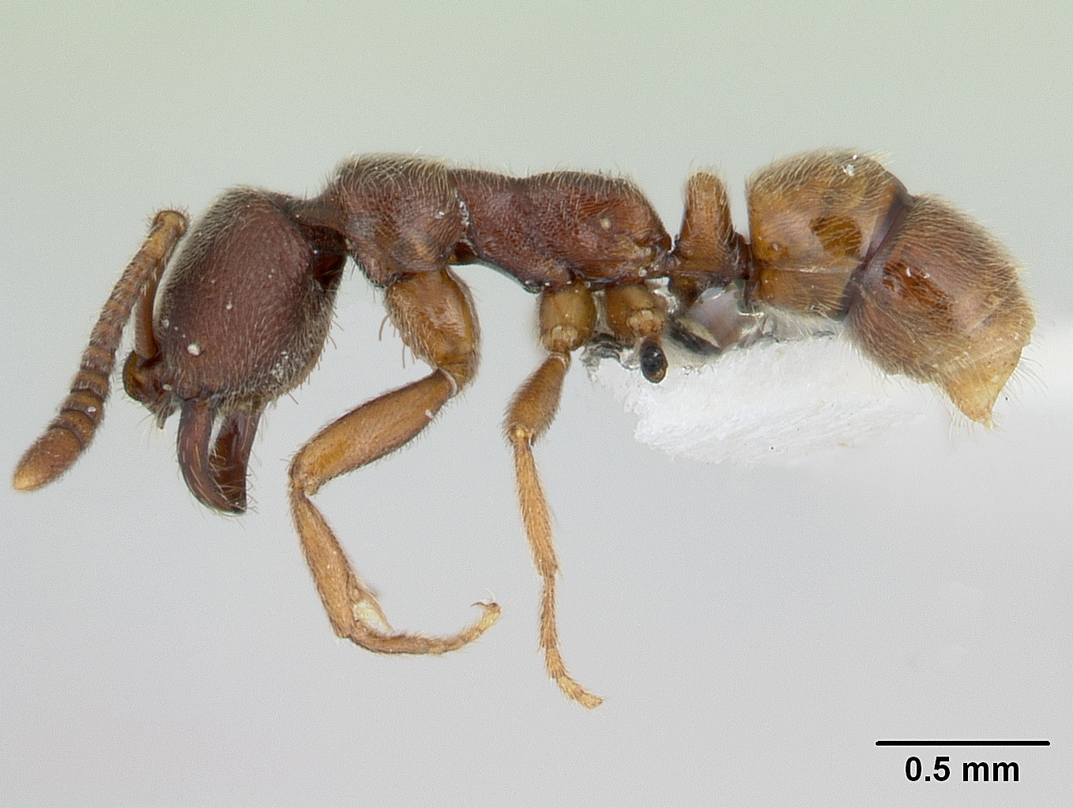
- Simopelta pergandei worker

Scientific classification
- Kingdom: Animalia
- Phylum: Arthropoda
- Clade: Pancrustacea
- Class: Insecta
- Order: Hymenoptera
- Family: Formicidae
- Subfamily: Ponerinae
- Tribe: Ponerini
- Alliance: Pachycondyla genus group
- Genus: Simopelta; Mann, 1922

Type species
- Belonopelta jeckylli Mann, 1916

Diversity
- 21 species

= Simopelta =

Genus of ants

Simopelta is a Neotropical genus of ants in the subfamily Ponerinae.

== Distribution ==
The genus is known from central and northern South America, where they are primarily found in mid-elevation moist forests.

== Description ==
Workers are slender, small in size (2.1–4.9 mm), and black to orange in color. Queens are dichthadiiform (wingless and with enlarged gasters) and "morphologically simplified" relative to workers. Males remain unknown.

Species have an army-ant life style, including group predation and nomadism. However, belonging to the tribe Ponerini, they are evidently ponerines and the army-ant like characters are deemed to have evolved through convergent evolution. Compared to other ponerines, colonies are large, consisting of 1,000 to 2,000 individuals.

== Species ==
- Simopelta andersoni MacKay & MacKay, 2008
- Simopelta bicolor Borgmeier, 1950
- Simopelta breviscapa MacKay & MacKay, 2008
- Simopelta curvata (Mayr, 1887)
- Simopelta fernandezi MacKay & MacKay, 2008
- Simopelta jeckylli (Mann, 1916)
- Simopelta laevigata MacKay & MacKay, 2008
- Simopelta laticeps Gotwald & Brown, 1967
- Simopelta longinoda MacKay & MacKay, 2008
- Simopelta longirostris MacKay & MacKay, 2008
- Simopelta manni Wheeler, 1935
- Simopelta mayri MacKay & MacKay, 2008
- Simopelta minima (Brandao, 1989)
- Simopelta oculata Gotwald & Brown, 1967
- Simopelta paeminosa Snelling, 1971
- Simopelta pentadentata
- Simopelta pergandei (Forel, 1909)
- Simopelta quadridentata MacKay & MacKay, 2008
- Simopelta transversa MacKay & MacKay, 2008
- Simopelta vieirai MacKay & MacKay, 2008
- Simopelta williamsi Wheeler, 1935
