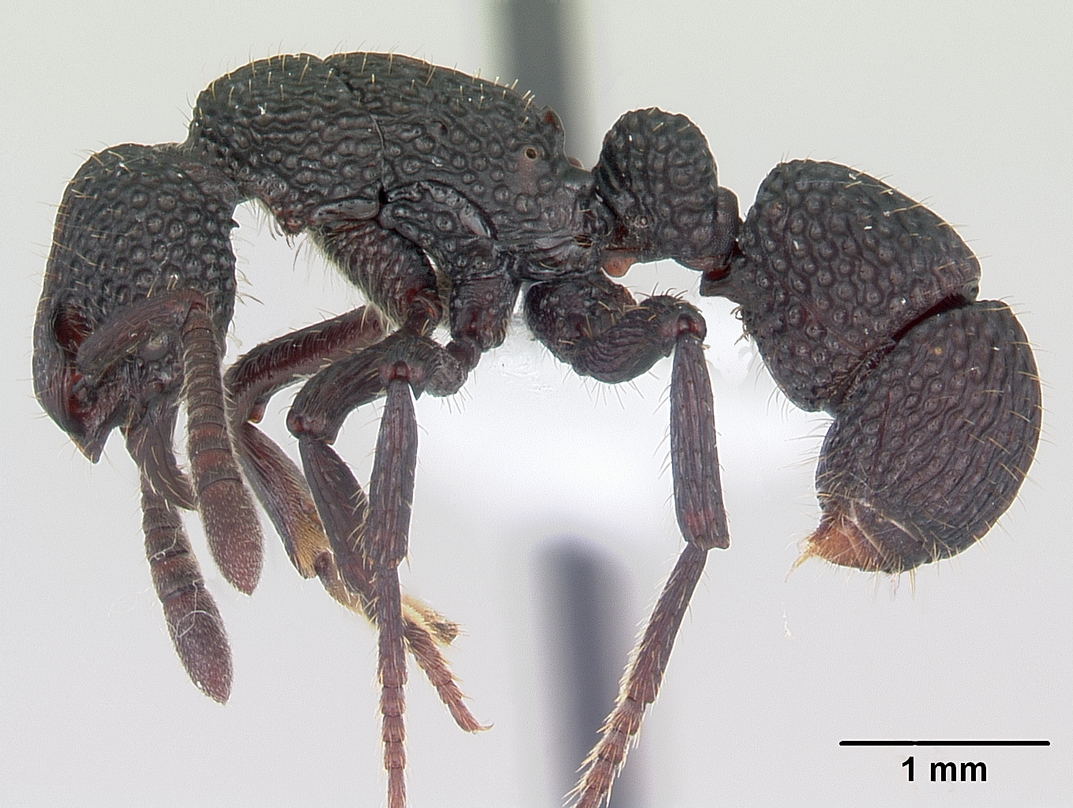
- Loboponera vigilans worker from Gabon

Scientific classification
- Kingdom: Animalia
- Phylum: Arthropoda
- Class: Insecta
- Order: Hymenoptera
- Family: Formicidae
- Subfamily: Ponerinae
- Tribe: Ponerini
- Alliance: Plectroctena genus group
- Genus: Loboponera; Bolton & Brown, 2002

Type species
- Loboponera vigilans

Diversity
- 9 species

= Loboponera =

Genus of ants

Loboponera is an Afrotropical genus of ants in the subfamily Ponerinae with nine recognized species. The genus is found in central and western Africa, from Ivory Coast to Rwanda. Little is known about their biology.

== Species ==
- Loboponera basalis Bolton & Brown, 2002
- Loboponera edentula Bolton & Brown, 2002
- Loboponera nasica (Santschi, 1920)
- Loboponera nobiliae Fisher, 2006
- Loboponera obeliscata Bolton & Brown, 2002
- Loboponera politula Bolton & Brown, 2002
- Loboponera subatra Bolton & Brown, 2002
- Loboponera trica Bolton & Brown, 2002
- Loboponera vigilans Bolton & Brown, 2002
