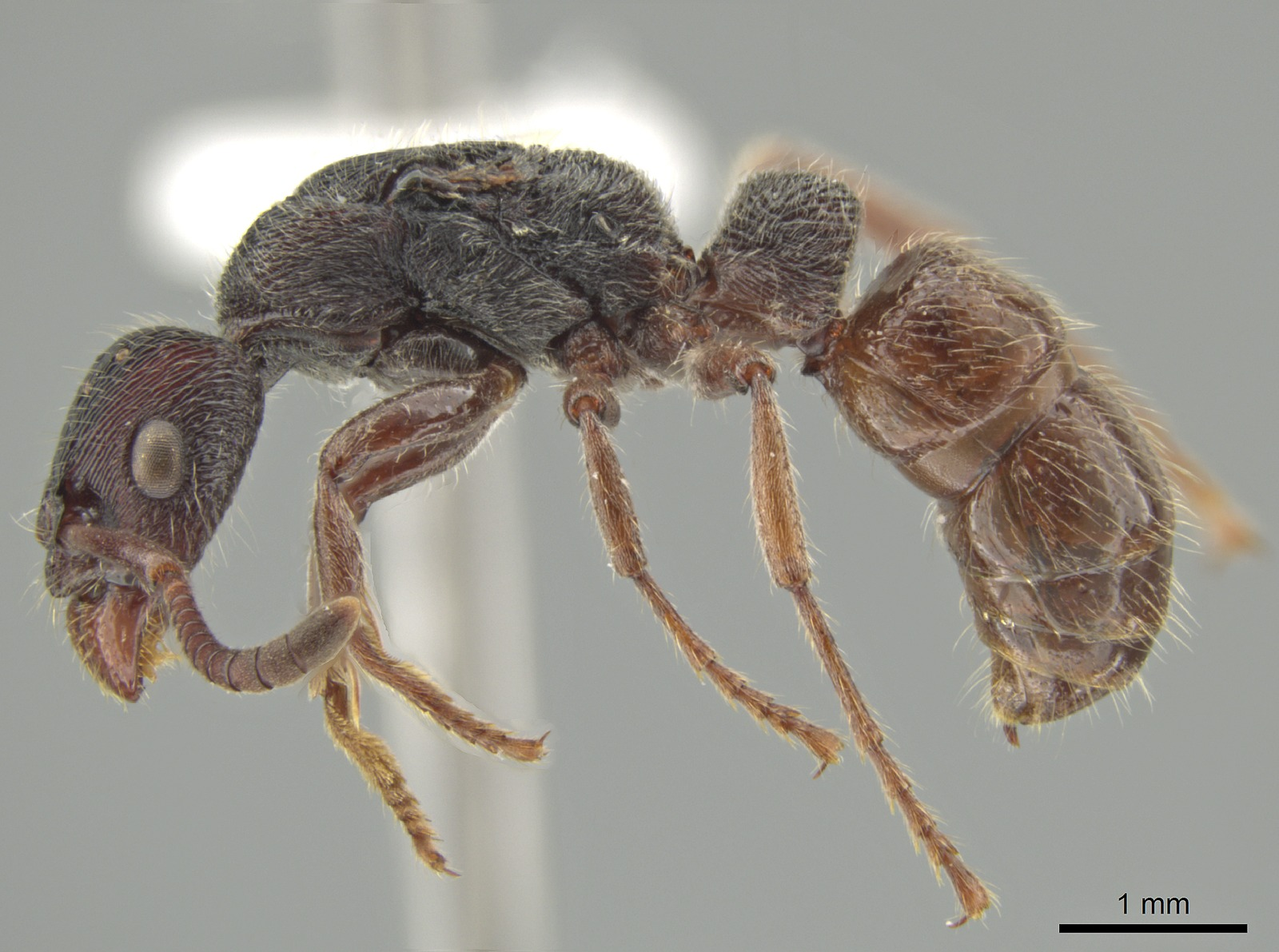
- Igaponera curiosa antweb.org type specimen

Scientific classification
- Kingdom: Animalia
- Phylum: Arthropoda
- Class: Insecta
- Order: Hymenoptera
- Family: Formicidae
- Subfamily: Ponerinae
- Tribe: Ponerini
- Genus: Igaponera; Troya et al., 2022
- Species: I. curiosa

Binomial name
- Igaponera curiosa Troya et al., 2022

= Igaponera =

Genus of ants

Igaponera is a monotypic genus of ponerine ants native to Amazonas described in 2022 containing one species Igaponera curiosa. First described in 2010 as Pachycondyla curiosa in 2010, I. curiosa was placed in Neoponera for a short time in 2021 before its current placement by Troya et al. 2022.
