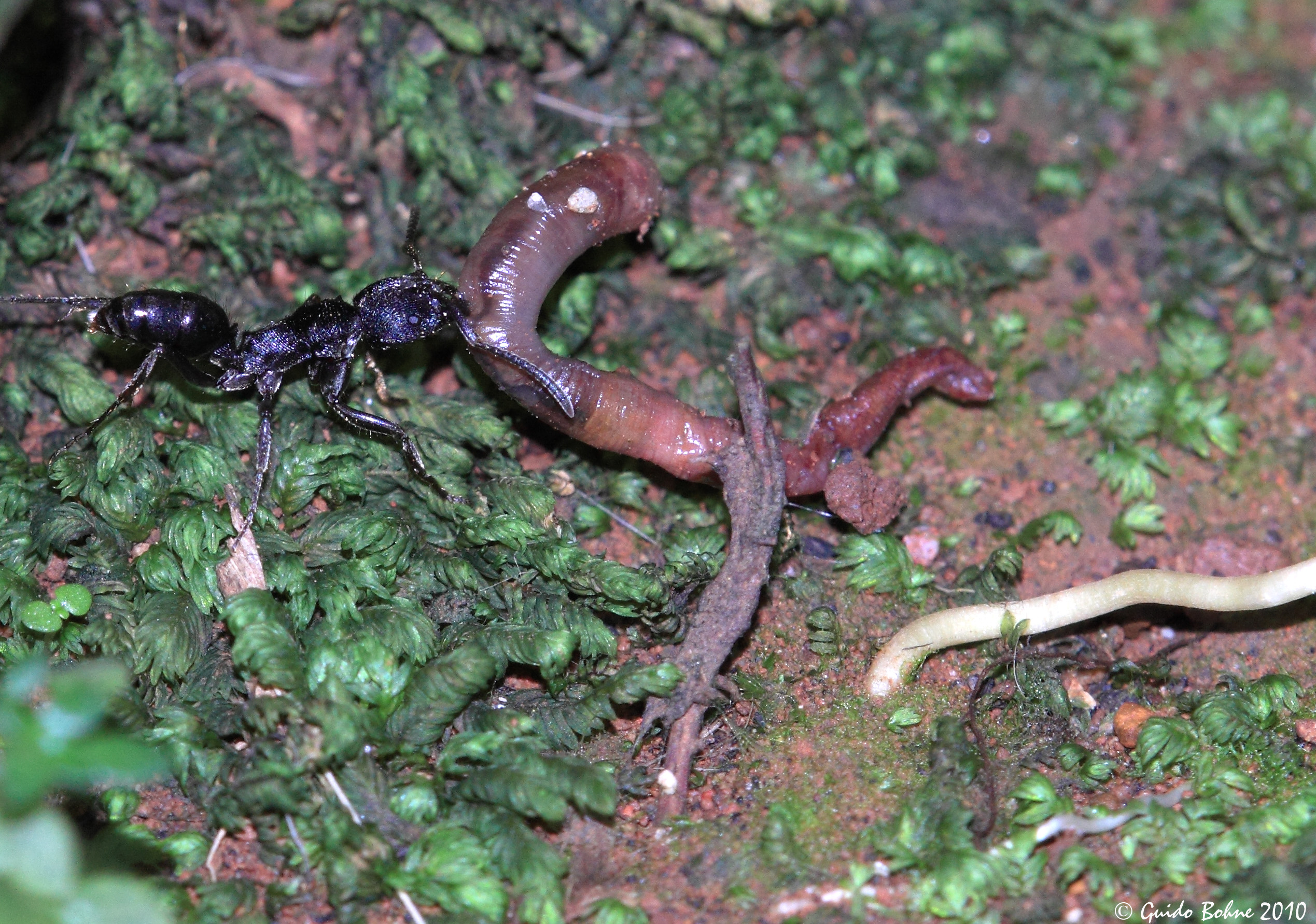
- Odontoponera sp. feeding on an earthworm

Scientific classification
- Kingdom: Animalia
- Phylum: Arthropoda
- Class: Insecta
- Order: Hymenoptera
- Family: Formicidae
- Subfamily: Ponerinae
- Tribe: Ponerini
- Genus: Odontoponera; Mayr, 1862

Type species
- Ponera denticulata Smith, F., 1858

Diversity
- 2 species

= Odontoponera =

Genus of ants

Odontoponera is a small Southeast Asia genus of ants in the subfamily Ponerinae.

== Description ==
Workers are medium in size (9–12 mm); queens are similar to workers but larger (11–13 mm) and winged.

== Distribution ==
Its two species are restricted to Southeast Asia, distributed from India in the west to the Philippines in the east, and from southern China further south down to Indonesia. The ants are locally abundant, with O. denticulata having the widest distribution of the species, from mainland Asia to the Philippines and Sundaland; O. transversa is found from the Malay Peninsula south to the islands of Sundaland.

== Taxonomy ==
Odontoponera was established by Mayr (1862) to house the species Ponera denticulata (now Odontoponera denticulata), placing it in the subfamily Ponerinae. O. denticulata was later synonymized with O. transversa, but was revived as a species by Yamane (2009). Molecular phylogeny by Schmidt's (2013) placed the genus in the Odontomachus group, although it is not closely related to any other genus. The name means "toothed Ponera", incorporating the prefix odonto-.

== Species ==
- Odontoponera denticulata (Smith, 1858)
- Odontoponera transversa (Smith, 1857)
