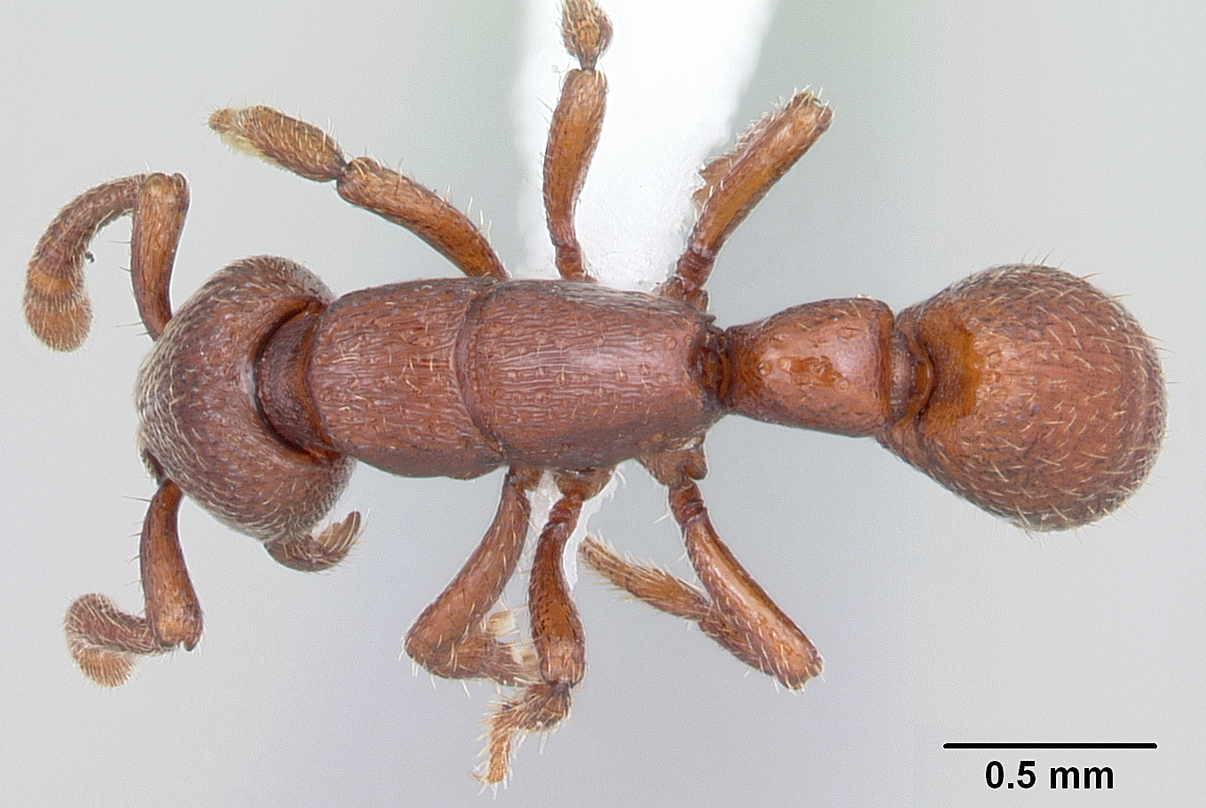
- B. vicans, holotype specimen

Scientific classification
- Kingdom: Animalia
- Phylum: Arthropoda
- Class: Insecta
- Order: Hymenoptera
- Family: Formicidae
- Subfamily: Ponerinae
- Tribe: Ponerini
- Alliance: Plectroctena genus group
- Genus: Boloponera; Fisher, 2006
- Species: B. vicans

Binomial name
- Boloponera vicans Fisher, 2006

= Boloponera =

Genus of ants

Boloponera is a genus of small ants in the subfamily Ponerinae. The genus contains the single species Boloponera vicans, known from a single worker specimen collected in leaf litter in the Central African Republic. It is sometimes referred to as Bry's ant after its discoverer, Brian Fisher.

== Description ==
The worker specimen is small (3.3 mm) and orange in color. It has linear mandibles, with two small teeth. Nothing is known about its biology, but the linear mandibles suggest that the ants are specialized predators.
