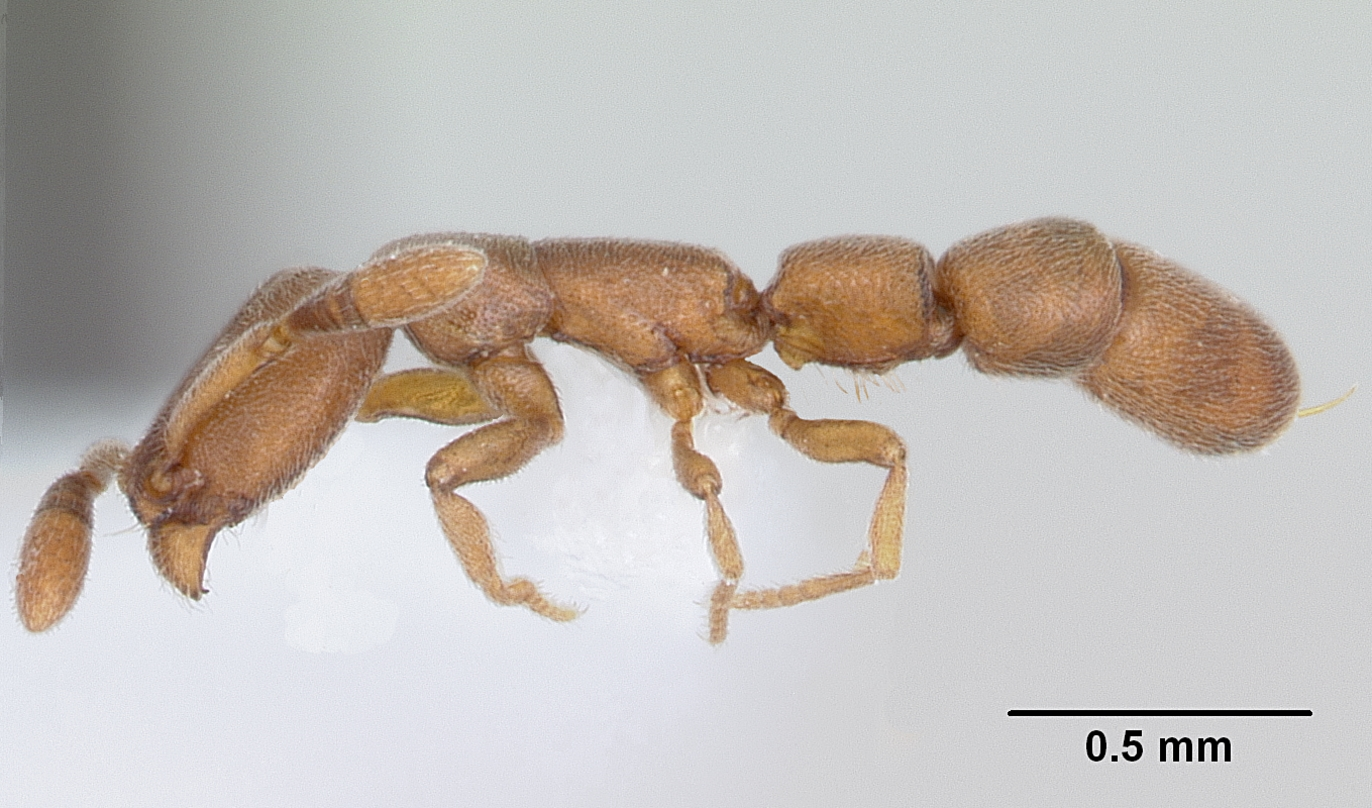
- Dolioponera fustigera worker from Cameroon

Scientific classification
- Kingdom: Animalia
- Phylum: Arthropoda
- Class: Insecta
- Order: Hymenoptera
- Family: Formicidae
- Subfamily: Ponerinae
- Tribe: Ponerini
- Genus: Dolioponera; Brown, 1974
- Species: D. fustigera

Binomial name
- Dolioponera fustigera Brown, 1974

= Dolioponera =

Genus of ants

Dolioponera is a genus of small ants in the subfamily Ponerinae containing the single species Dolioponera fustigera. The genus is known only from a few specimens from west and central Africa. Little is known about their biology, and males remain unknown.
