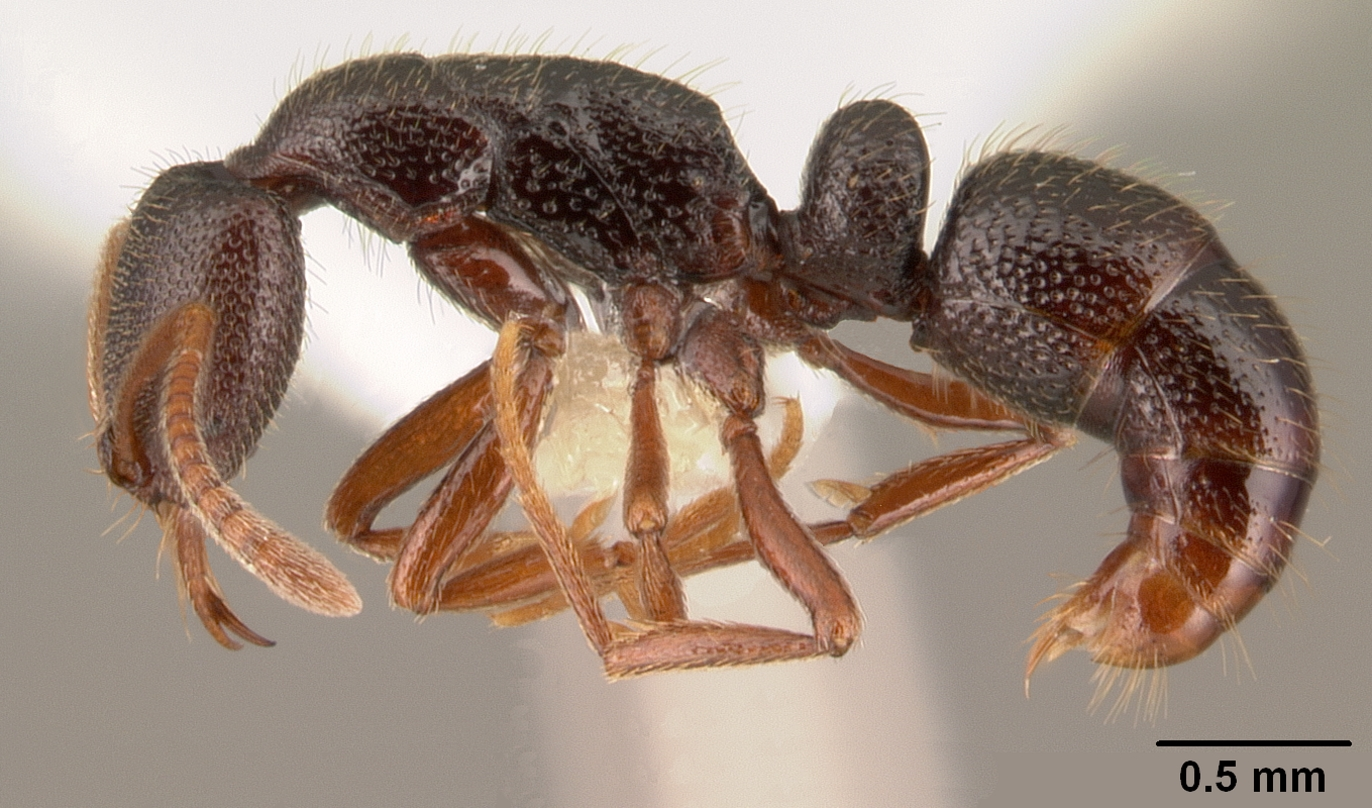
- Emeryopone buttelreepeni worker from Malaysia

Scientific classification
- Kingdom: Animalia
- Phylum: Arthropoda
- Clade: Pancrustacea
- Class: Insecta
- Order: Hymenoptera
- Family: Formicidae
- Subfamily: Ponerinae
- Tribe: Ponerini
- Alliance: Ponera genus group
- Genus: Emeryopone; Forel, 1912

Type species
- Emeryopone buttelreepeni

Diversity
- 5 species

= Emeryopone =

Genus of ants

Emeryopone is a small genus of ants in the subfamily Ponerinae. The genus is distributed in Asia, from Israel to Indonesia. Little is known about their biology, and males remain unknown.

== Species ==
- Emeryopone buttelreepeni Forel, 1912
- Emeryopone franzi (Baroni Urbani, 1975)
- Emeryopone loebli (Baroni Urbani, 1975)
- Emeryopone melaina Xu, 1998
- Emeryopone narendrani Varghese, 2006
