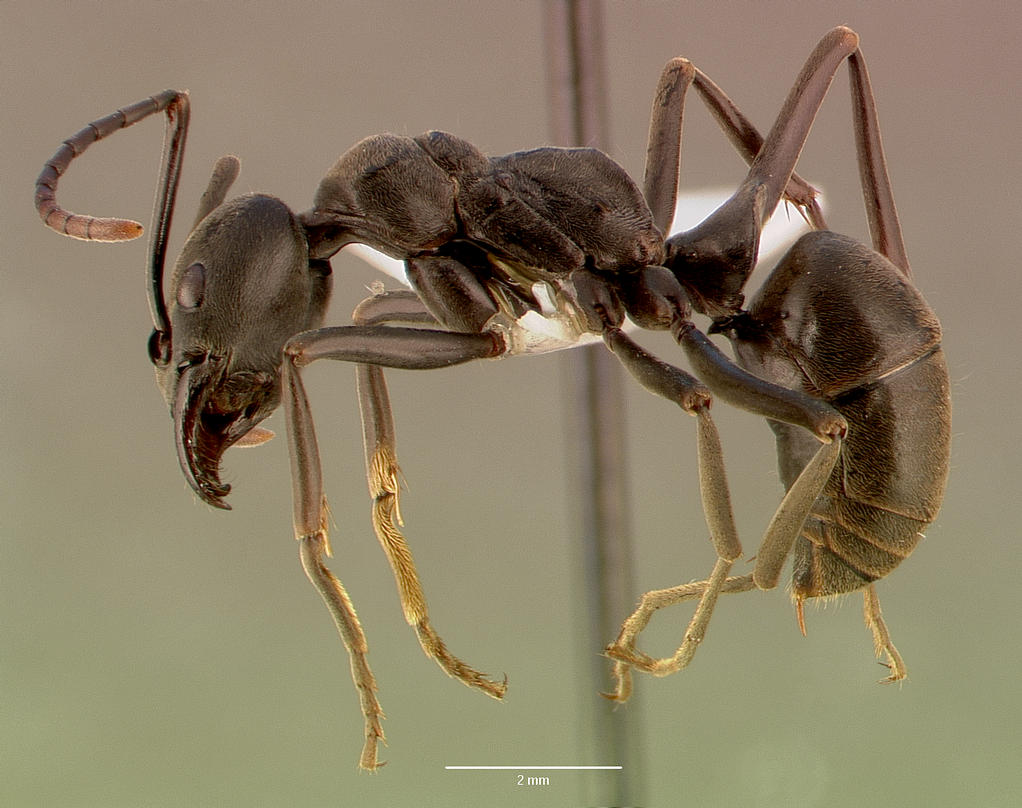
- Hagensia havilandi worker

Scientific classification
- Kingdom: Animalia
- Phylum: Arthropoda
- Class: Insecta
- Order: Hymenoptera
- Family: Formicidae
- Subfamily: Ponerinae
- Tribe: Ponerini
- Alliance: Odontomachus genus group
- Genus: Hagensia; Forel, 1901

Type species
- Megaloponera havilandi Forel, 1901

Diversity
- 2 species

= Hagensia =

Genus of ants

Hagensia is a small genus of ants in the subfamily Ponerinae. Its two species are known only from coastal areas in South Africa. Workers are large (10.5–13.0 mm); queens are unknown, but gamergates (reproductive female workers) occurs in both species.

== Species ==
- Hagensia havilandi (Forel, 1901)
- Hagensia peringueyi (Emery, 1899)
