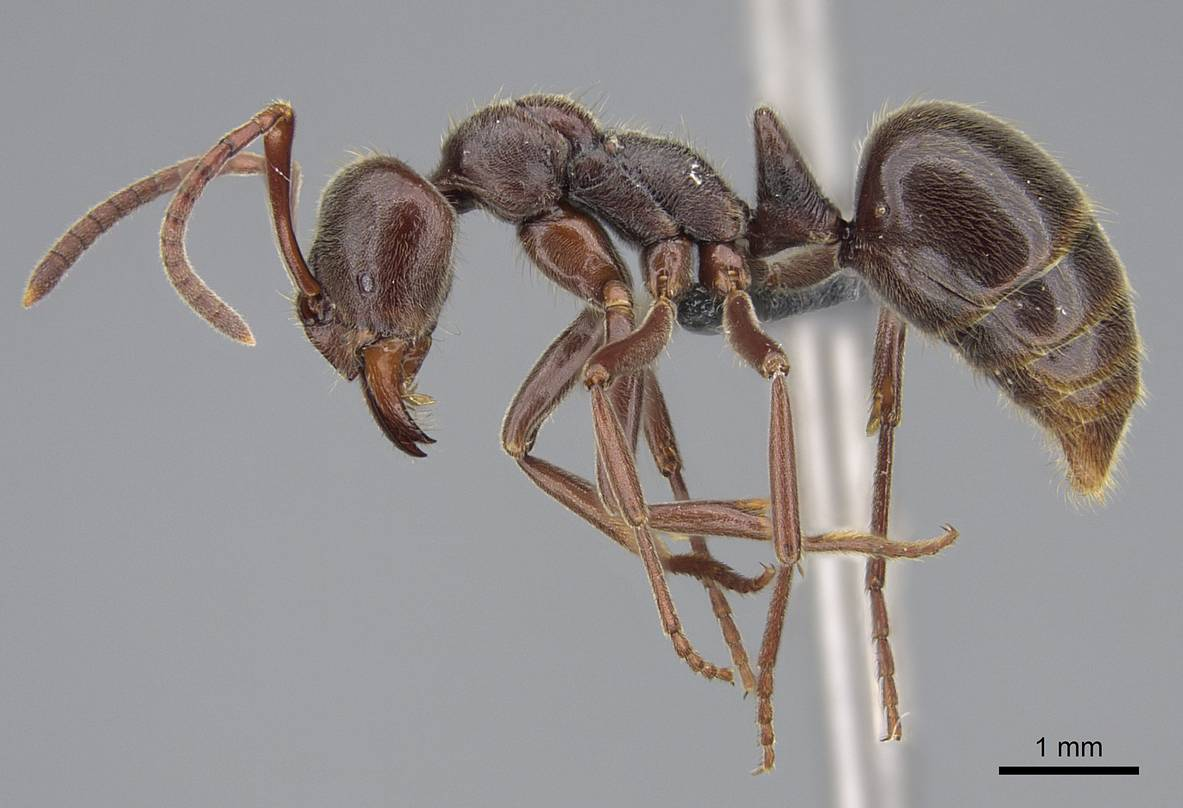
- Corrieopone nouragues antweb.org type specimen

Scientific classification
- Kingdom: Animalia
- Phylum: Arthropoda
- Class: Insecta
- Order: Hymenoptera
- Family: Formicidae
- Subfamily: Ponerinae
- Tribe: Ponerini
- Genus: Corrieopone; Esteves & Fisher, 2021
- Species: C. nouragues

Binomial name
- Corrieopone nouragues Esteves & Fisher, 2021

= Corrieopone =

Genus of ants

Corrieopone is a monotypic genus of ponerine ants native to French Guiana described by Esteves & Fisher, 2021 containing one species Corrieopone nouragues.
