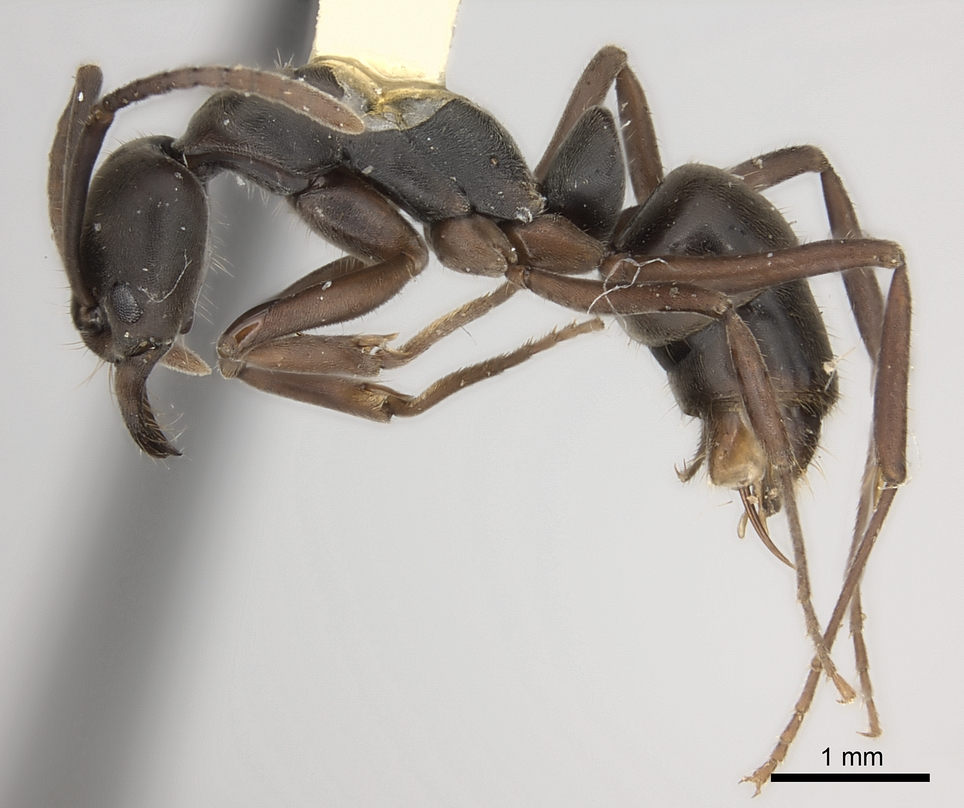
- Mayaponera constricta worker

Scientific classification
- Kingdom: Animalia
- Phylum: Arthropoda
- Class: Insecta
- Order: Hymenoptera
- Family: Formicidae
- Subfamily: Ponerinae
- Tribe: Ponerini
- Alliance: Pachycondyla genus group
- Genus: Mayaponera; Schmidt & Shattuck, 2014

Type species
- Ponera constricta Mayr, 1884

Diversity
- 7 species

= Mayaponera =

Genus of ants

Mayaponera is a genus of ants in the subfamily Ponerinae.

== Species ==
Species accepted as of May 2025:

- Mayaponera arhuaca
- Mayaponera becculata
- Mayaponera cernua
- Mayaponera conicula
- Mayaponera constricta
- Mayaponera longidentata
- Mayaponera pergandei
