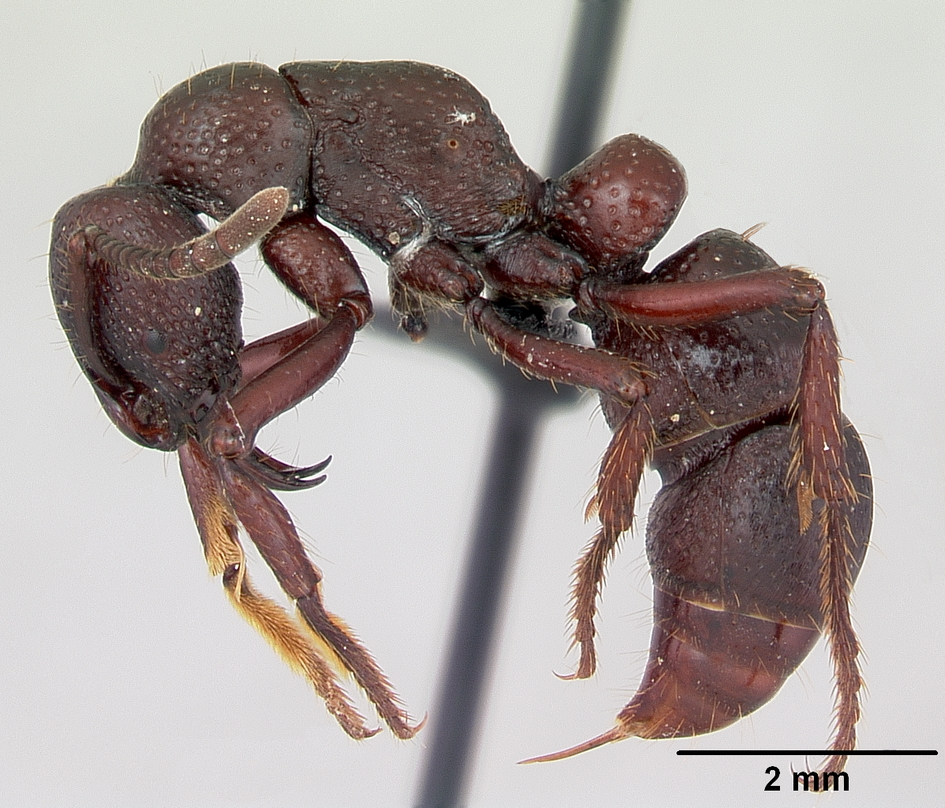
- Psalidomyrmex procerus worker from Gabon

Scientific classification
- Kingdom: Animalia
- Phylum: Arthropoda
- Class: Insecta
- Order: Hymenoptera
- Family: Formicidae
- Subfamily: Ponerinae
- Tribe: Ponerini
- Alliance: Plectroctena genus group
- Genus: Psalidomyrmex; André, 1890

Type species
- Psalidomyrmex foveolatus André, 1890

Diversity
- 6 species

= Psalidomyrmex =

Genus of ants

Psalidomyrmex is a genus of ants in the subfamily Ponerinae. The genus is known from Sub-Saharan Africa, where colonies nest in rotten wood.

== Species ==
- Psalidomyrmex feae Menozzi, 1922
- Psalidomyrmex foveolatus André, 1890
- Psalidomyrmex procerus Emery, 1901
- Psalidomyrmex reichenspergeri Santschi, 1913
- Psalidomyrmex sallyae Bolton, 1975
- Psalidomyrmex wheeleri Santschi, 1923
