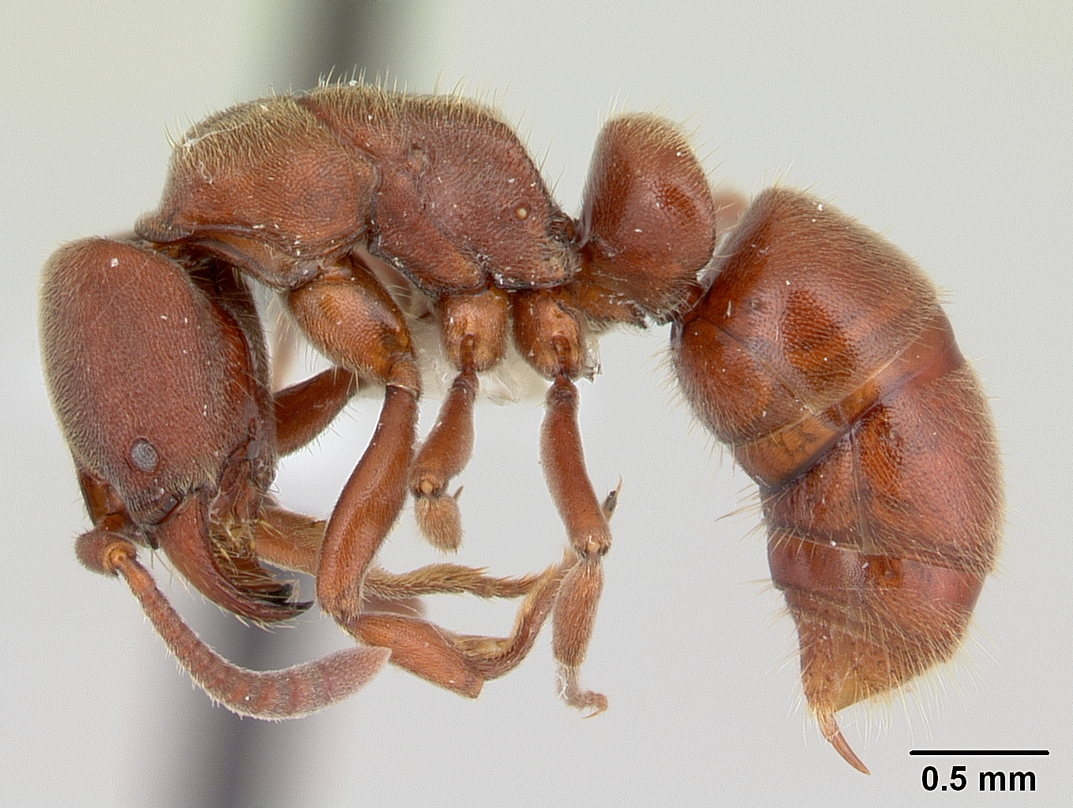
- Rasopone lunaris worker

Scientific classification
- Kingdom: Animalia
- Phylum: Arthropoda
- Class: Insecta
- Order: Hymenoptera
- Family: Formicidae
- Subfamily: Ponerinae
- Tribe: Ponerini
- Alliance: Pachycondyla genus group
- Genus: Rasopone; Schmidt & Shattuck, 2014

Type species
- Ponera ferruginea Smith, F., 1858

Diversity
- 11 species

= Rasopone =

Genus of ants

Rasopone is genus of ants in the subfamily Ponerinae. The genus is restricted to Central and South America.

== Species ==
- Rasopone arhuaca (Forel, 1901)
- Rasopone becculata MacKay & MacKay, 2010
- Rasopone breviscapa MacKay & MacKay, 2010
- Rasopone cernua MacKay & MacKay, 2010
- Rasopone conicula MacKay & MacKay, 2010
- Rasopone ferruginea (Smith, 1858)
- Rasopone longidentata MacKay & MacKay, 2010
- Rasopone lunaris (Emery, 1896)
- Rasopone minuta (MacKay & MacKay, 2010)
- Rasopone pergandei (Forel, 1909)
- Rasopone rupinicola MacKay & MacKay, 2010
