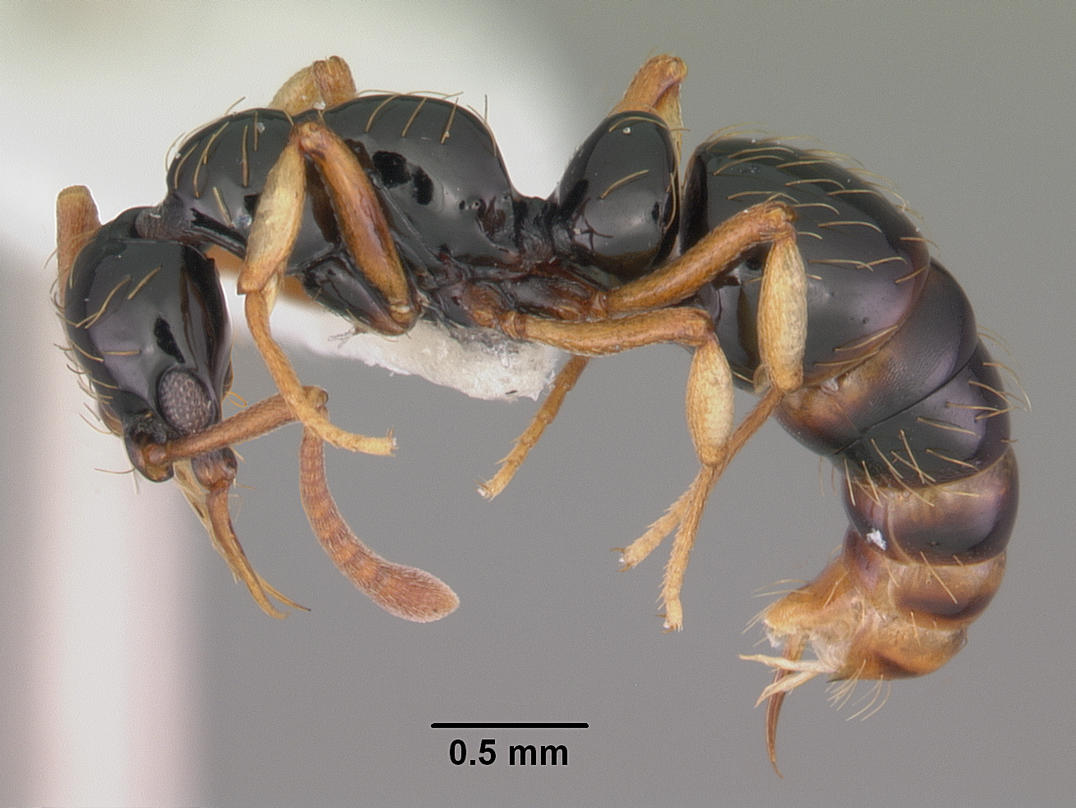
- Thaumatomyrmex atrox worker from Peru

Scientific classification
- Kingdom: Animalia
- Phylum: Arthropoda
- Class: Insecta
- Order: Hymenoptera
- Family: Formicidae
- Subfamily: Ponerinae
- Tribe: Ponerini
- Alliance: Pachycondyla genus group
- Genus: Thaumatomyrmex; Mayr, 1887

Type species
- Thaumatomyrmex mutilatus Mayr, 1887

Diversity
- 12 species

= Thaumatomyrmex =

Genus of ants

Thaumatomyrmex is a Neotropical genus of ants in the subfamily Ponerinae, found from Mexico to Brazil. They are notable for their pitchfork-shaped mandibles, which they use to capture millipedes of the order Polyxenida. The genus is a specialist predator of polyxenids, and one of only two ant genera known to prey upon polyxenids.

== Taxonomy and phylogenetics ==
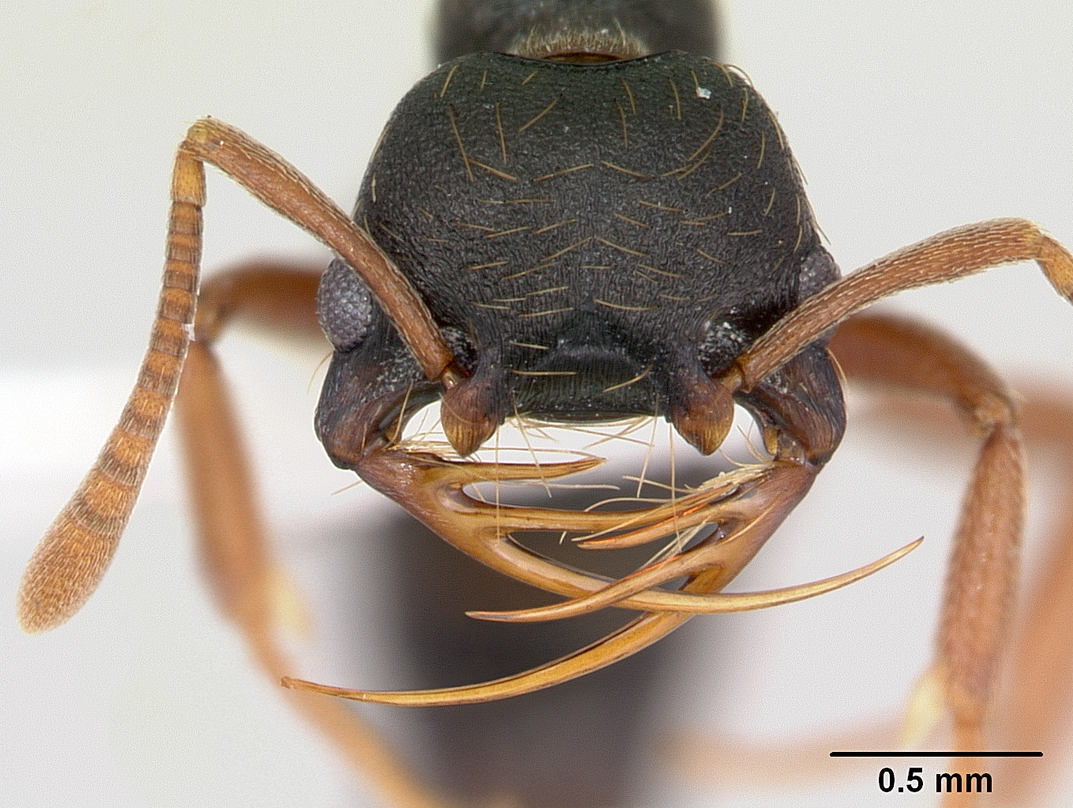
Head view of a Thaumatomyrmex mandibularis worker, showing its characteristic pitchfork-shaped mandibles

The genus was established by Mayr in 1877 to house the single species Thaumatomyrmex mutilatus, discovered in Brazil. Since its inception, the genus has been placed in various tribes: Ectatommini, Ponerini, Cylindromyrmicini, and its own tribe, Thaumatomyrmecini. Molecular phylogeny by Schmidt & Shattuck (2014) confirmed that the genus is nested within Ponerini. Twelve species has been described, and a few undescribed taxa are known.

== Distribution ==
Thaumatomyrmex is found only in the Neotropics, from Mexico to Brazil (including Cuba and other Caribbean islands). The genus was once thought to be rare, but with better sampling techniques, the ants are now found more frequently.

== Description ==
Workers are small in size (3.3–5.0 mm) and have pitchfork-shaped mandibles with three long teeth. They are specialist predators of millipedes of the order Polyxenida. Polyxenids are an unusual type of prey, only known to be preyed upon by Thaumatomyrmex and Probolomyrmex ants. The millipedes are covered with hooked bristle setae, which entangles potential predators. Thaumatomyrmex use their long mandibles to hold the polyxenids before immobilizing them by stinging, and then stripping the prey from their protective setae. The brush-like hairs on the workers' legs are used to scrape the setae off "like cleaning a chicken". Workers forage individually in the leaf litter.

Alate queens remain undescribed, although Kempf (1975) mentioned an alate T. zeteki queen in the collections of the U.S. National Museum, this has however never been confirmed. Gamergates (reproductive female workers) are known from at least two species (T. atrox and T. contumax).

== Species ==
- Thaumatomyrmex atrox Weber, 1939
- Thaumatomyrmex bariay Fontenla Rizo, 1995
- Thaumatomyrmex cochlearis Creighton, 1928
- Thaumatomyrmex contumax Kempf, 1975
- Thaumatomyrmex ferox Mann, 1922
- Thaumatomyrmex mandibularis Baroni Urbani & De Andrade, 2003
- Thaumatomyrmex manni Weber, 1939
- Thaumatomyrmex mutilatus Mayr, 1887
- Thaumatomyrmex nageli Baroni Urbani & De Andrade, 2003
- Thaumatomyrmex paludis Weber, 1942
- Thaumatomyrmex soesilae Makhan, 2007
- Thaumatomyrmex zeteki Smith, 1944
