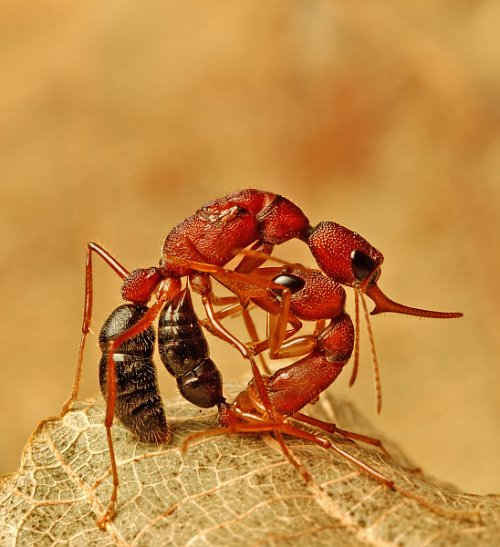
- Fighting Harpegnathos saltator

Scientific classification
- Kingdom: Animalia
- Phylum: Arthropoda
- Clade: Pancrustacea
- Class: Insecta
- Order: Hymenoptera
- Family: Formicidae
- Subfamily: Ponerinae
- Tribe: Ponerini; Lepeletier de Saint-Fargeau, 1835

Genera
- See text

Diversity
- 61 genera

= Ponerini =

Tribe of ants

Ponerini is a tribe of ponerine ants with 46 genera and 6 extinct genera. It contains every ponerine genus except Platythyrea, which is placed in its own tribe Platythyreini.

== Genera ==
=== Extant ===
==== Pachycondyla genus group ====
- Belonopelta Mayr, 1870
- Dinoponera Roger, 186
- Mayaponera Schmidt & Shattuck, 2014
- Neoponera Emery, 1901
- Pachycondyla Smith, 1858
- Rasopone Schmidt & Shattuck, 2014
- Simopelta Mann, 1922
- Thaumatomyrmex Mayr, 1887

==== Ponera genus group ====
- Austroponera Schmidt & Shattuck, 2014
- Corrieopone Esteves & Fisher, 2021
- Diacamma Mayr, 1862
- Ectomomyrmex Mayr, 1867
- Emeryopone Forel, 1912
- Parvaponera Schmidt & Shattuck, 2014
- Ponera Latreille, 1804
- Pseudoponera Emery, 1900
- Sritoponera Fisher et al. 2025
- Wadeura Weber, 1939

==== Odontomachus genus group ====
- Anochetus Mayr, 1861
- Asphinctopone Santschi, 1914
- Boltonopone Fisher et al. 2025
- Bothroponera Mayr, 1862
- Brachyponera Emery, 1900
- Buniapone Schmidt & Shattuck, 2014
- Cryptopone Emery, 1893
- Dolioponera Brown, 1974
- Euponera Forel, 1891
- Feroponera Bolton & Fisher, 2008
- Fisheropone Schmidt & Shattuck, 2014
- Hagensia Forel, 1901
- Leptogenys Roger, 1861
- Makebapone Fisher et al. 2025
- Megaponera Mayr, 1862
- Mesoponera Emery, 1900
- Myopias Roger, 1861
- Odontomachus Latreille, 1804
- Odontoponera Mayr, 1862
- Ophthalmopone Forel, 1890
- Paltothyreus Mayr, 1862
- Phrynoponera Wheeler, 1920
- Promyopias Santschi, 1914
- Pseudoneoponera Donisthorpe, 1943
- Streblognathus Mayr, 1862
- Subiridopone Fisher et al. 2025
- Xiphopelta Forel, 1913

==== Harpegnathos genus group ====
- Harpegnathos Jerdon, 1851

==== Hypoponera genus group ====
- Hypoponera Santschi, 1938

==== Plectroctena genus group ====
- Boloponera Fisher, 2006
- Centromyrmex Mayr, 1866
- Loboponera Bolton & Brown, 2002
- Plectroctena Smith, 1858
- Psalidomyrmex André, 1890

==== Unknown genus group ====
- Igaponera Troya et al., 2022

=== Extinct ===
- †Archiponera Carpenter, 1930
- †Cephalopone Dlussky & Wedmann, 2012
- †Cyrtopone Dlussky & Wedmann, 2012
- †Desyopone Boudinot & Perrichot, 2022
- †Messelepone Dlussky & Wedmann, 2012
- †Ponerites Dlussky & Rasnitsyn, 2003
- †Protopone Dlussky, 1988
- †Siinikaponera Varela-Hernández et al., 2024

== Phylogeny ==
The maximum-probability molecular cladogram of the tribe constructed by Fisher et al. in 2025 is shown here. All genera are represented except for Igaponera, which is only known from a single queen specimen. Six unofficial genus groups are recognized by the authors, namely the Pachycondyla, Ponera, Harpegnathos, Plectroctena, Hypoponera, and Odontomachus groups. These genus groups are also referred to as alliances.

- Ponerini
  - - Pachycondyla genus group
      - Simopelta
      - - - Belonopelta
          - Thaumatomyrmex
        - - Mayaponera
          - - Rasopone
            - - Neoponera
              - - Dinoponera
                - Pachycondyla
    - Ponera genus group
      - Diacamma
      - - Ponera
        - - Emeryopone
          - - - Cryptopone
              - Ectomomyrmex
            - - Austroponera
              - - Pseudoponera
                - - Sritoponera
                  - - Parvaponera
                    - Wadeura
  - - Odontomachus genus group
      - Unnamed genus (Note: This monotypic genus currently contains the species currently known as Neoponera bucki, which is not a true Neoponera species, however it has not yet been formally described as of 2025.)
      - - - Odontomachus
          - Anochetus
        - - - - Odontoponera
              - - Brachyponera
                - Xiphopelta
            - - Hagensia
              - - Makebapone
                - - Fisheropone
                  - - Feroponera
                    - - Boltonopone
                      - - Dolioponera
                        - Euponera
          - - - Bothroponera
              - - Pseudoneoponera
                - - Streblognathus
                  - Phrynoponera
            - - - - Megaponera
                  - Ophthalmopone
                - - Mesoponera
                  - - Myopias
                    - Leptogenys
              - - - Subiridopone
                  - - Asphinctopone
                    - Corrieopone
                - - Paltothyreus
                  - - Buniapone
                    - Promyopias
    - - Harpegnathos genus group
        Harpegnathos
      - - Hypoponera genus group
          Hypoponera
        - Plectroctena genus group
          - Centromyrmex
          - - Psalidomyrmex
            - - Loboponera
              - - Boloponera
                - Plectroctena
