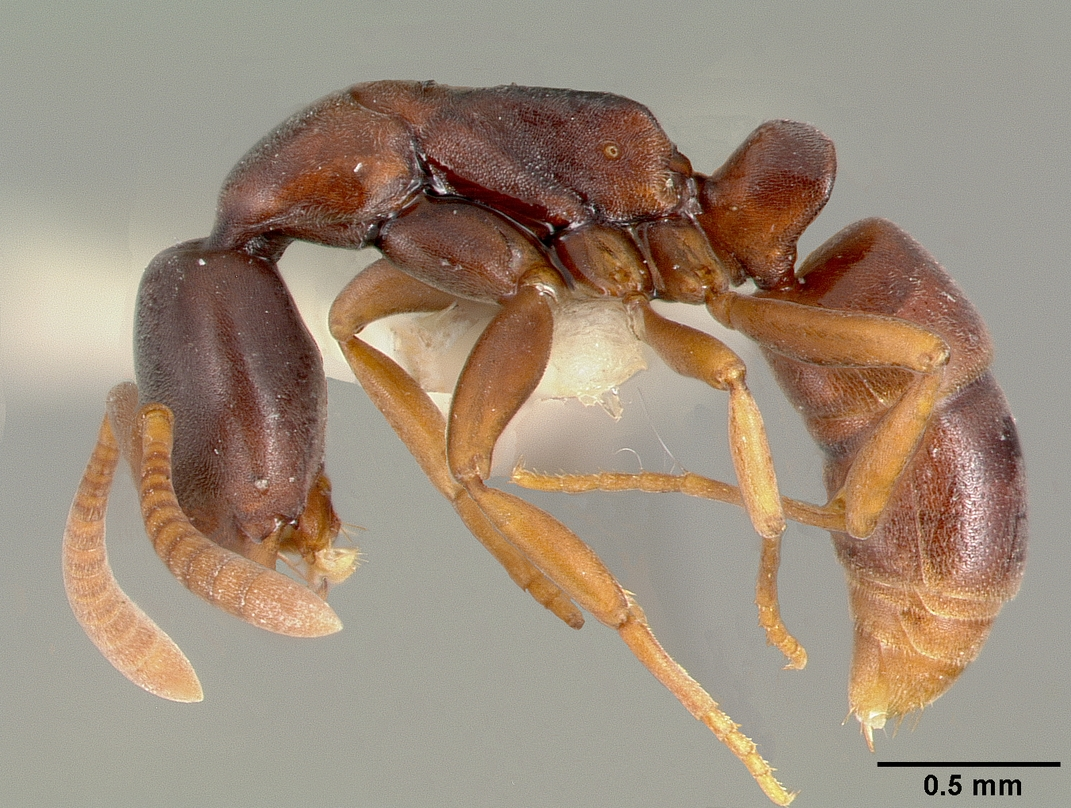
- Belonopelta deletrix

Scientific classification
- Kingdom: Animalia
- Phylum: Arthropoda
- Class: Insecta
- Order: Hymenoptera
- Family: Formicidae
- Subfamily: Ponerinae
- Tribe: Ponerini
- Alliance: Pachycondyla genus group
- Genus: Belonopelta; Mayr, 1870

Type species
- Belonopelta attenuata Mayr, 1870

Diversity
- 2 species

Synonyms
- Leiopelta Baroni Urbani, 1975

= Belonopelta =

Genus of ants

Belonopelta is a Neotropical genus of ants in the subfamily Ponerinae. The genus contains two species: B. deletrix is known from Mesoamerica and Colombia, while B. attenuata is only known from Colombia. Members of this genus are rarely collected, and little is known about their habits. Males remain unknown for both species, and queens and larvae have only been described for B. deletrix.

== Species ==
- Belonopelta attenuata Mayr, 1870
- Belonopelta deletrix Mann, 1922
