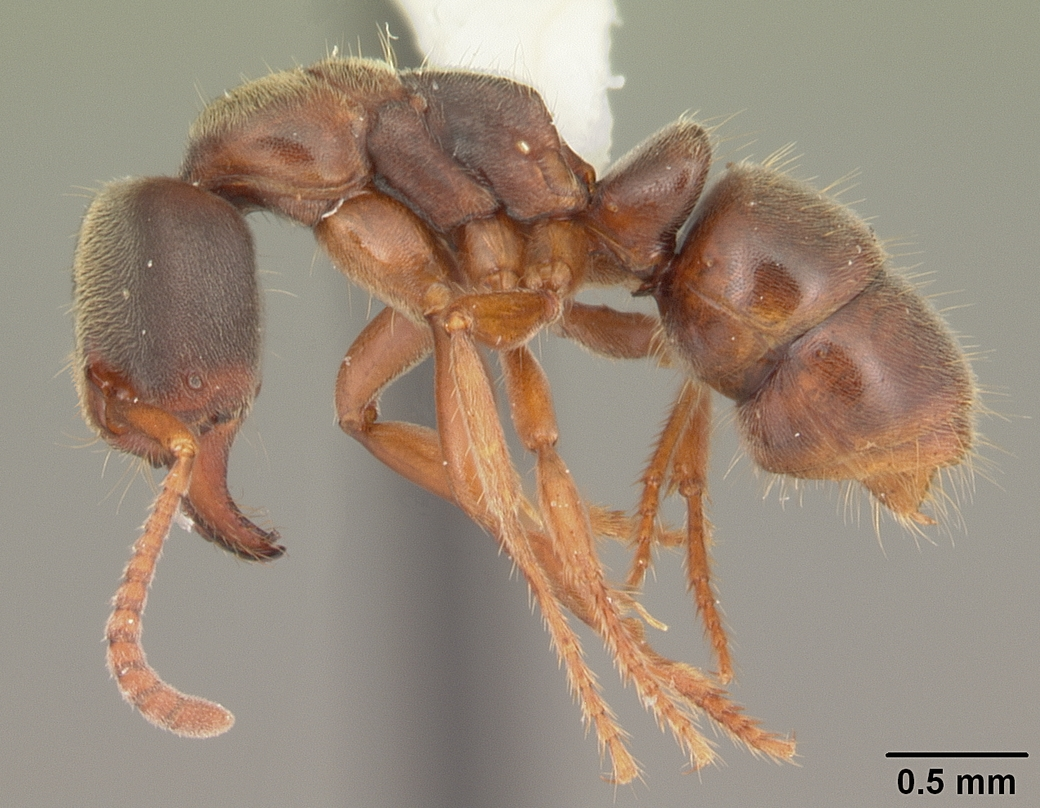
- Pseudoponera stigma worker

Scientific classification
- Kingdom: Animalia
- Phylum: Arthropoda
- Clade: Pancrustacea
- Class: Insecta
- Order: Hymenoptera
- Family: Formicidae
- Subfamily: Ponerinae
- Tribe: Ponerini
- Alliance: Ponera genus group
- Genus: Pseudoponera; Emery, 1900

Type species
- Ponera quadridentata (junior synonym of Pseudoponera stigma)

Diversity
- 5 species

Synonyms
- Trachymesopus Emery, 1911

= Pseudoponera =

Genus of ants

Pseudoponera is a small genus of ponerine ants. The genus was described by Emery in 1900. The genus contains five species, all native to the Neotropics, however P. stigma is present as an introduced species in Oceania and parts of east and Southeast Asia.

== Species ==
As of 2026, five species belong to Pseudoponera.

- Pseudoponera cognata (Emery, 1896)
- Pseudoponera gilberti (Kempf, 1960)
- Pseudoponera gilloglyi (MacKay & MacKay, 2010)
- Pseudoponera stigma (Fabricius, 1804)
- Pseudoponera succedanea (Roger, 1863)
