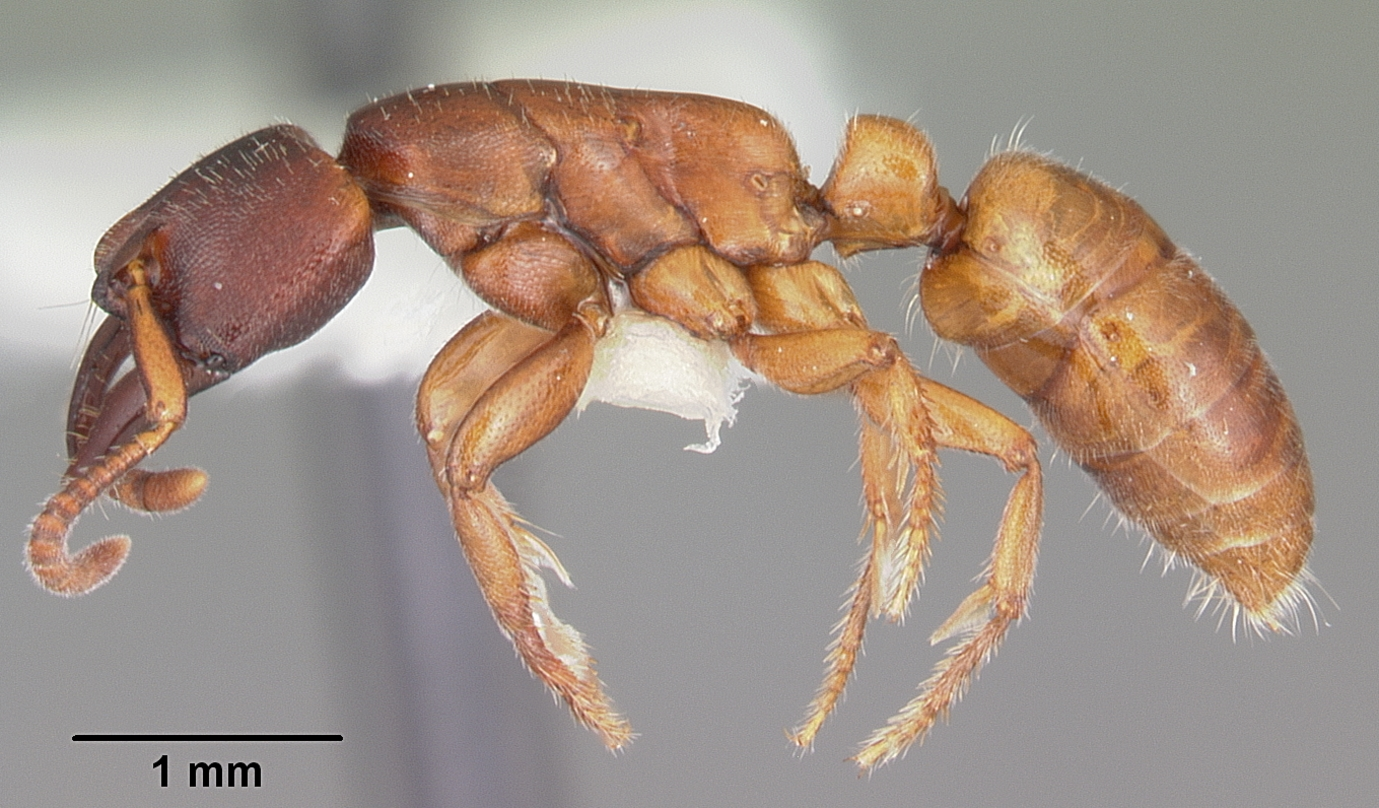
- Promyopias silvestrii worker from the Ivory Coast

Scientific classification
- Kingdom: Animalia
- Phylum: Arthropoda
- Class: Insecta
- Order: Hymenoptera
- Family: Formicidae
- Subfamily: Ponerinae
- Tribe: Ponerini
- Genus: Promyopias; Santschi, 1914
- Species: P. silvestrii

Binomial name
- Promyopias silvestrii (Santschi, 1914)

Synonyms
- Myopias silvestrii Santschi, 1914 (type species); Promyopias asili Crawley, 1916

= Promyopias =

Genus of ants

Promyopias is an Afrotropical genus of ant in the subfamily Ponerinae containing the single species Promyopias silvestrii. The rare genus has previously been regarded as a separate genus, as a subgenus and as a provisional synonymy, but was reinstated at genus-rank in 2008.

== Description ==
Promyopias, known from the Afrotropics, is uncommon but widely distributed. Its diet, presumably termites but not actually demonstrated, may be more restricted or specialized than in Centromyrmex. The morphology of the mandible is unique and immediately identifies Promyopias silvestrii. Males are unknown.

== Taxonomy ==
Santschi (1914) initially associated Promyopias with Myopias, the latter a moderately sized genus widespread in the Oriental, Malesian and Austral regions, because of supposed overall similarities in the form of the mandible and clypeus. It now seems certain that these similarities are the result of convergence through the development of similar predatory behaviors and life styles in the two genera. Major characters of Myopias that differentiate it from Promyopias include: eyes usually present in worker (absent in one species); scape not flattened; mesonotum sharply defined; spiniform setae entirely absent from middle and hind tibiae and basitarsi; helcium located at base of first gastral segment; posterodorsal margin of helcium with a median emargination; prora an anteroventral tooth; stridulitrum present.

During its history Promyopias has been regarded as a separate genus or as a subgenus of two other ponerine genera. The provisional synonymy of Promyopias with Centromyrmex proposed by Brown (1973) and accepted by Bolton (1994, 2003) was based on the presence and distribution of spiniform setae on the legs. Bolton & Fisher (2008) formally reinstated Promyopias at genus-rank.
