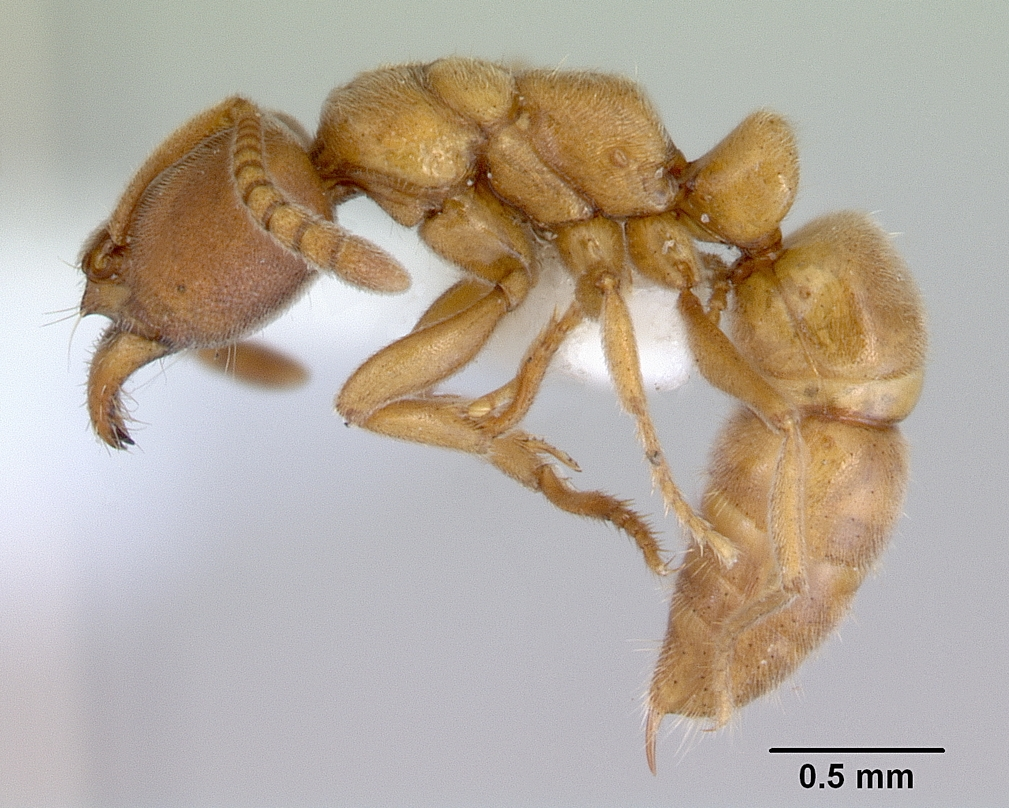
- Parvaponera darwinii worker

Scientific classification
- Kingdom: Animalia
- Phylum: Arthropoda
- Class: Insecta
- Order: Hymenoptera
- Family: Formicidae
- Subfamily: Ponerinae
- Tribe: Ponerini
- Genus: Parvaponera; Schmidt & Shattuck, 2014

Type species
- Belonopelta darwinii Forel, 1893

Diversity
- 4 species

= Parvaponera =

Genus of ants

Parvaponera is a genus of ants in the subfamily Ponerinae. The genus is distributed in Africa (and Madagascar), Southeast Asia, Australia and the Solomon Islands. Workers are slender and small in size. Queens are similar to workers, but larger and winged.

== Species ==
- Parvaponera cavimaculata Wang & Zhao, 2009
- Parvaponera darwinii (Forel, 1893)
- Parvaponera myropola (Menozzi, 1925)
- Parvaponera sheldoni (Mann, 1919)
