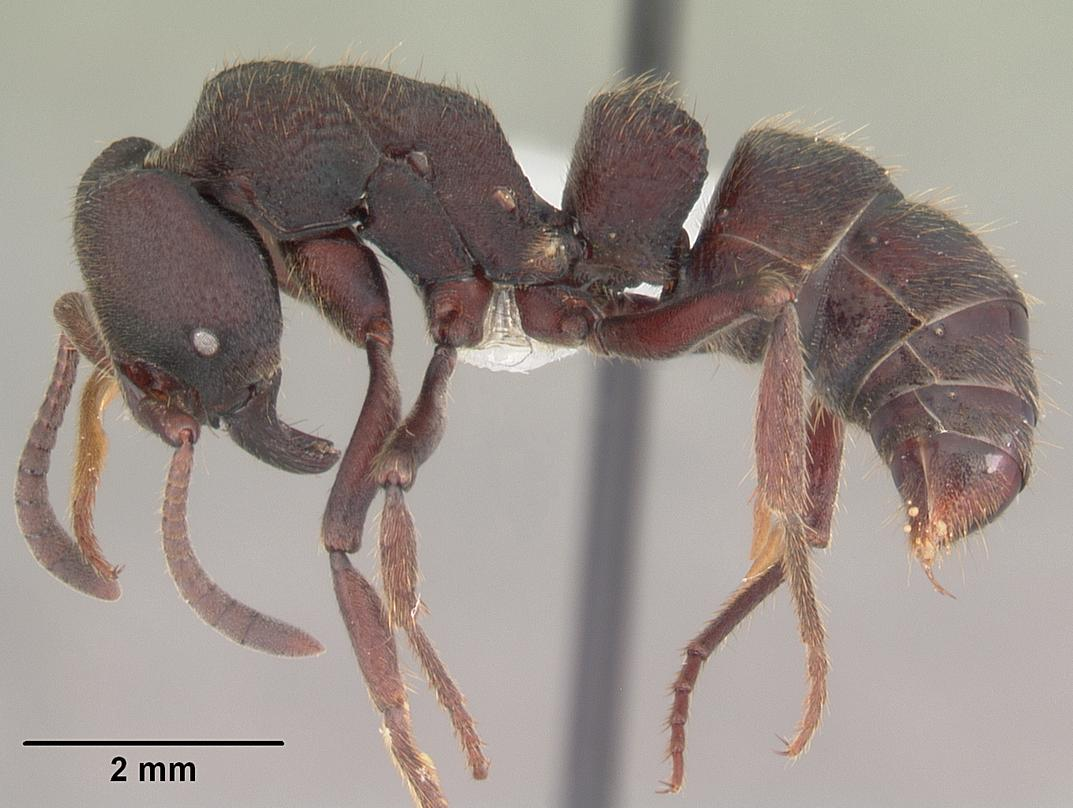
- Bothroponera cambouei worker

Scientific classification
- Kingdom: Animalia
- Phylum: Arthropoda
- Class: Insecta
- Order: Hymenoptera
- Family: Formicidae
- Subfamily: Ponerinae
- Tribe: Ponerini
- Alliance: Odontomachus genus group
- Genus: Bothroponera; Mayr, 1862

Type species
- Ponera pumicosa Roger, 1860

Diversity
- 26 species

= Bothroponera =

Genus of ants

Bothroponera is a genus of ants in the subfamily Ponerinae containing 26 species. It is distributed in Africa and Asia.

== Species ==
- Bothroponera aspera Arnold, 1962
- Bothroponera berthoudi (Forel, 1901)
- Bothroponera cambouei Forel, 1891
- Bothroponera cariosa Emery, 1895
- Bothroponera cavernosa (Roger, 1860)
- Bothroponera comorensis (André, 1887)
- Bothroponera cribrata (Santschi, 1910)
- Bothroponera fugax (Forel, 1907)
- Bothroponera granosa (Roger, 1860)
- Bothroponera laevissima (Arnold, 1915)
- Bothroponera masoala (Rakotonirina & Fisher, 2013)
- Bothroponera montivaga Arnold, 1947
- Bothroponera pachyderma (Emery, 1901)
- Bothroponera perroti Forel, 1891
- Bothroponera planicornis (Rakotonirina & Fisher, 2013)
- Bothroponera pumicosa (Roger, 1860)
- Bothroponera rubescens Santschi, 1937
- Bothroponera sanguinea (Santschi, 1920)
- Bothroponera sculpturata (Santschi, 1912)
- Bothroponera strigulosa Emery, 1895
- Bothroponera talpa André, 1890
- Bothroponera tavaratra (Rakotonirina & Fisher, 2013)
- Bothroponera umgodikulula Joma & Mackay, 2013
- Bothroponera vazimba (Rakotonirina & Fisher, 2013)
- Bothroponera wasmannii Forel, 1887
- Bothroponera zumpti Santschi, 1937
