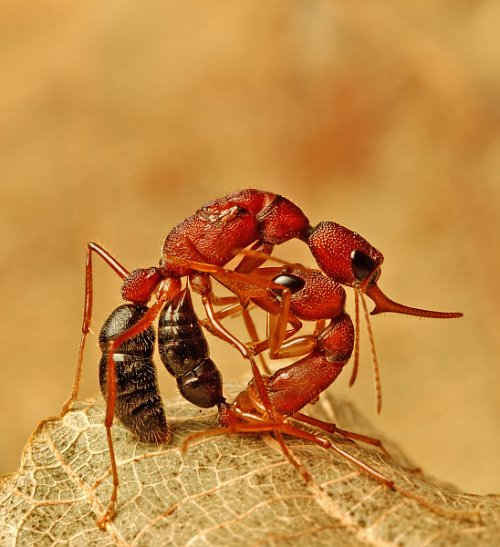
- Fighting Harpegnathos saltator

Scientific classification
- Kingdom: Animalia
- Phylum: Arthropoda
- Clade: Pancrustacea
- Class: Insecta
- Order: Hymenoptera
- Family: Formicidae
- Clade: Poneria
- Subfamily: Ponerinae; Lepeletier, 1835

Type genus
- Ponera Latreille, 1804

Diversity
- 54 genera

= Ponerinae =

Ponerinae Temporal range: Turonian-Recent

Subfamily of ants

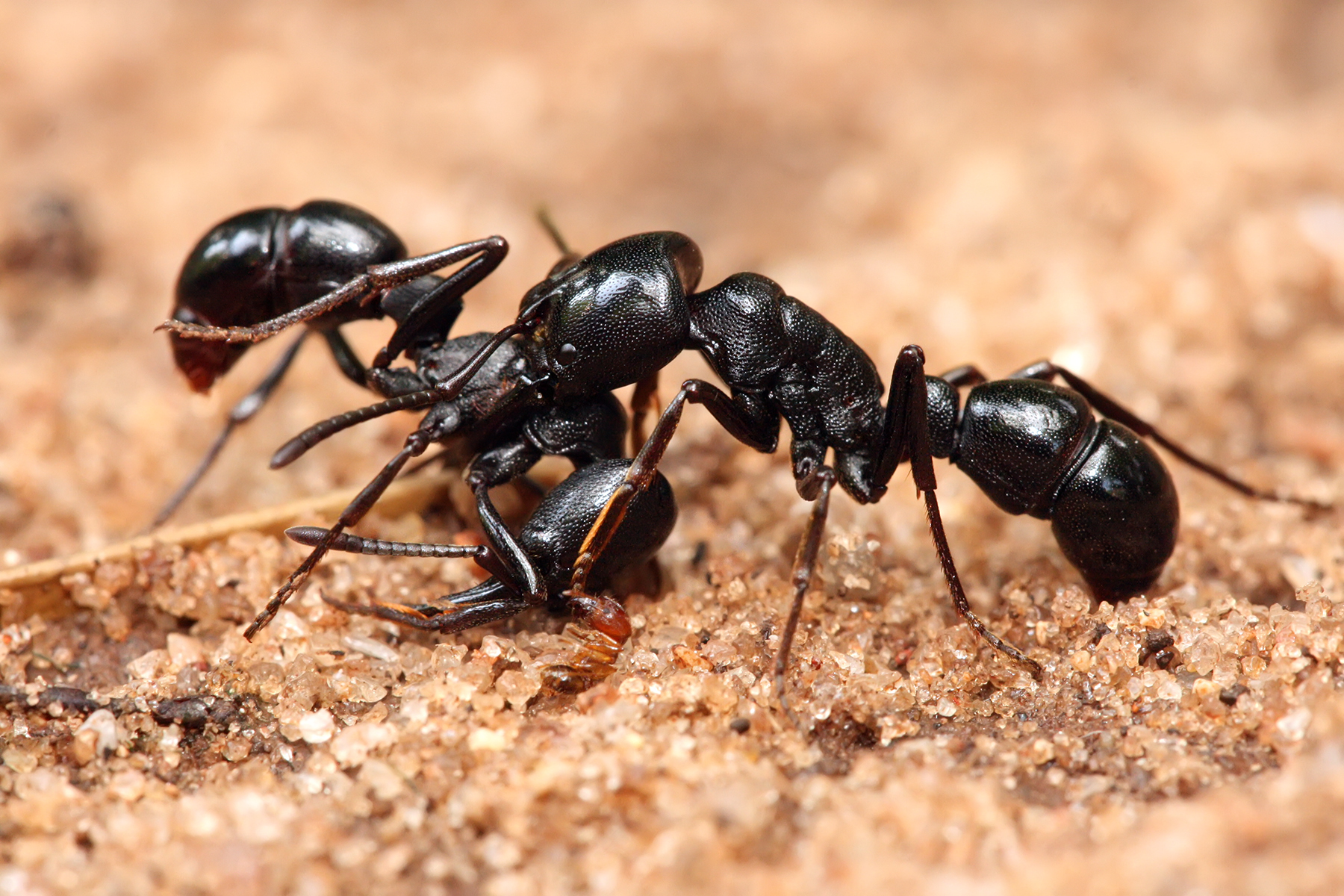
Plectroctena sp. fighting

Ponerinae, or ponerine ants, are a subfamily of poneromorph ants containing about 1,600 species in 54 extant genera. They include Dinoponera gigantea, one of the world's largest species of ant. In several species of ponerine ants, mated workers have replaced the queen as the functional egg-layers. In such queenless species, the reproductive status of workers can only be determined through ovarian dissections.

== Description and identification ==
Ponerinae are most easily identified from other subfamilies by possessing a single-segmented petiole and the gaster usually being constricted between the first and second segments. Odontomachus lack this constriction, but these can be identified from their elongate, straight mandibles attached close together along the front margin of the head and with teeth only at the mandible tips. They are rare examples of stinging ants. Females have 12-segmented antennae, whereas males have 13-segmented antennae.

== Behavior ==
These ants typically nest in soil, forest litter, or rotting logs, and are predacious. They primarily prey on isopods. They mostly live in small colonies of up to 200 workers. They can be found mostly in tropical environments, but have been found in southeastern Canada and New York.

== Genera ==
- Platythyreini Emery, 1901
  - Platythyrea Roger, 1863
- Ponerini Lepeletier de Saint-Fargeau, 1835
  - Anochetus Mayr, 1861
  - †Archiponera Carpenter, 1930
  - Asphinctopone Santschi, 1914
  - Austroponera Schmidt & Shattuck, 2014
  - Belonopelta Mayr, 1870
  - Boloponera Fisher, 2006
  - Boltonopone Fisher et al. 2025
  - Bothroponera Mayr, 1862
  - Brachyponera Emery, 1900
  - Buniapone Schmidt & Shattuck, 2014
  - Centromyrmex Mayr, 1866
  - †Cephalopone Dlussky & Wedmann, 2012
  - Corrieopone Esteves & Fisher, 2021
  - Cryptopone Emery, 1893
  - †Cyrtopone Dlussky & Wedmann, 2012
  - †Desyopone Boudinot & Perrichot, 2022
  - Diacamma Mayr, 1862
  - Dinoponera Roger, 186
  - Dolioponera Brown, 1974
  - Ectomomyrmex Mayr, 1867
  - Emeryopone Forel, 1912
  - Euponera Forel, 1891
  - Feroponera Bolton & Fisher, 2008
  - Fisheropone Schmidt & Shattuck, 2014
  - Hagensia Forel, 1901
  - Harpegnathos Jerdon, 1851
  - Hypoponera Santschi, 1938
  - Igaponera Troya et al., 2022
  - Leptogenys Roger, 1861
  - Loboponera Bolton & Brown, 2002
  - Makebapone Fisher et al. 2025
  - Mayaponera Schmidt & Shattuck, 2014
  - Megaponera Mayr, 1862
  - Mesoponera Emery, 1900
  - †Messelepone Dlussky & Wedmann, 2012
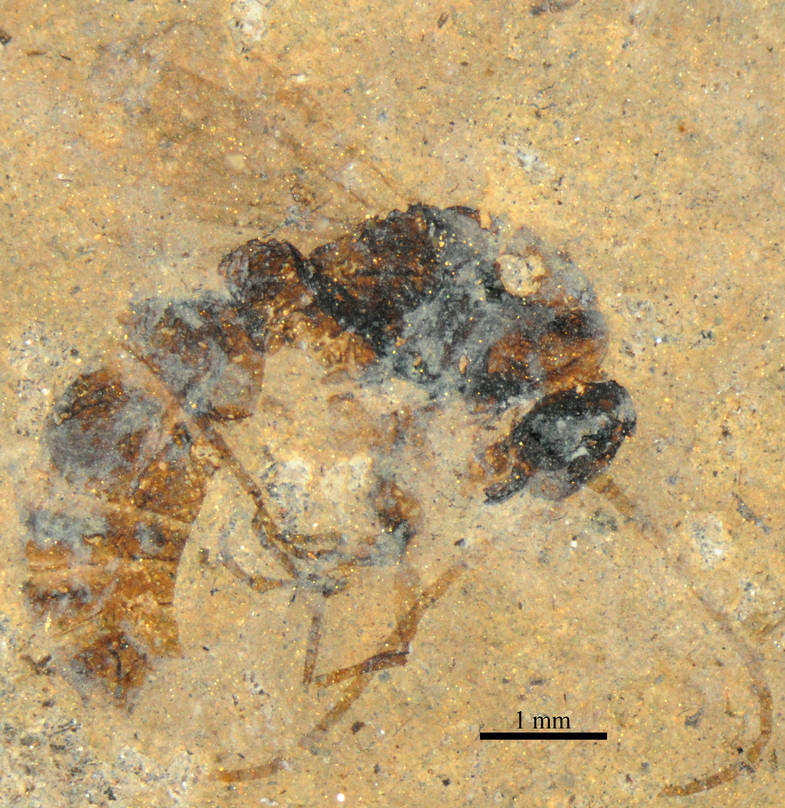
    Messelepone leptogenoides male
  - Myopias Roger, 1861
  - Neoponera Emery, 1901
  - Odontomachus Latreille, 1804
  - Odontoponera Mayr, 1862
  - Ophthalmopone Forel, 1890
  - Pachycondyla Smith, 1858
  - Paltothyreus Mayr, 1862
  - Parvaponera Schmidt & Shattuck, 2014
  - Phrynoponera Wheeler, 1920
  - Plectroctena Smith, 1858
  - Ponera Latreille, 1804
  - †Ponerites Dlussky & Rasnitsyn, 2003
  - Promyopias Santschi, 1914
  - †Protopone Dlussky, 1988
  - Psalidomyrmex André, 1890
  - Pseudoneoponera Donisthorpe, 1943
  - Pseudoponera Emery, 1900
  - Rasopone Schmidt & Shattuck, 2014
  - †Siinikaponera Varela-Hernández et al., 2024
  - Simopelta Mann, 1922
  - Sritoponera Fisher et al. 2025
  - Streblognathus Mayr, 1862
  - Subiridopone Fisher et al. 2025
  - Thaumatomyrmex Mayr, 1887
  - Wadeura Weber, 1939
  - Xiphopelta Forel, 1913
- incertae sedis
  - †Afropone Dlussky, Brothers & Rasnitsyn, 2004
  - †Eogorgites Hong, 2002
  - †Eoponerites Hong, 2002
  - †Furcisutura Hong, 2002
  - †Longicapitia Hong, 2002
  - †Taphopone Dlussky & Perfilieva, 2014

== Phylogeny ==
The maximum-probability molecular cladogram of the subfamily constructed by Fisher et al. in 2025 is shown here. All genera are represented except for Igaponera, which is only known from a single queen specimen. Six unofficial genus groups are recognized by the authors within the tribe Ponerini, namely the Pachycondyla, Ponera, Harpegnathos, Plectroctena, Hypoponera, and Odontomachus groups.

- Ponerinae
  - Platythyreini
    Platythyrea
  - Ponerini
    - - Pachycondyla genus group
        - Simopelta
        - - - Belonopelta
            - Thaumatomyrmex
          - - Mayaponera
            - - Rasopone
              - - Neoponera
                - - Dinoponera
                  - Pachycondyla
      - Ponera genus group
        - Diacamma
        - - Ponera
          - - Emeryopone
            - - - Cryptopone
                - Ectomomyrmex
              - - Austroponera
                - - Pseudoponera
                  - - Sritoponera
                    - - Parvaponera
                      - Wadeura
    - - Odontomachus genus group
        - Unnamed genus (Note: This monotypic genus currently contains the species currently known as Neoponera bucki, which is not a true Neoponera species, however it has not yet been formally described as of 2025.)
        - - - Odontomachus
            - Anochetus
          - - - - Odontoponera
                - - Brachyponera
                  - Xiphopelta
              - - Hagensia
                - - Makebapone
                  - - Fisheropone
                    - - Feroponera
                      - - Boltonopone
                        - - Dolioponera
                          - Euponera
            - - - Bothroponera
                - - Pseudoneoponera
                  - - Streblognathus
                    - Phrynoponera
              - - - - Megaponera
                    - Ophthalmopone
                  - - Mesoponera
                    - - Myopias
                      - Leptogenys
                - - - Subiridopone
                    - - Asphinctopone
                      - Corrieopone
                  - - Paltothyreus
                    - - Buniapone
                      - Promyopias
      - - Harpegnathos genus group
          Harpegnathos
        - - Hypoponera genus group
            Hypoponera
          - Plectroctena genus group
            - Centromyrmex
            - - Psalidomyrmex
              - - Loboponera
                - - Boloponera
                  - Plectroctena
