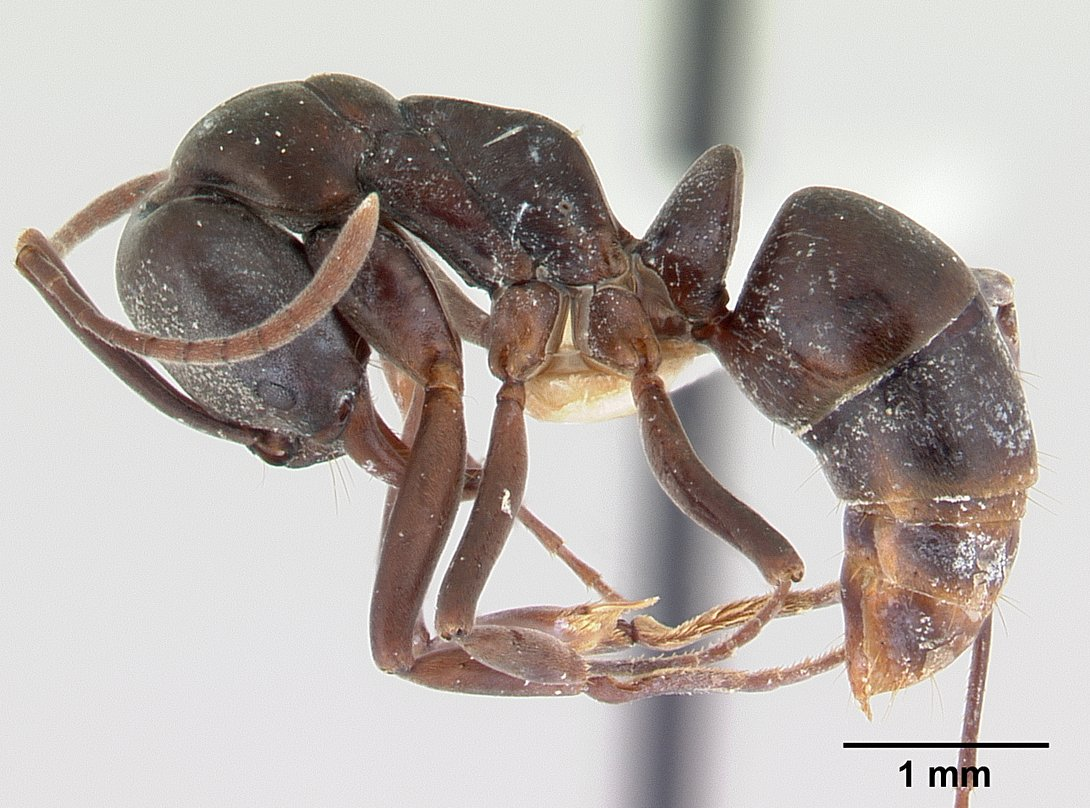
- Mesoponera melanaria worker

Scientific classification
- Kingdom: Animalia
- Phylum: Arthropoda
- Class: Insecta
- Order: Hymenoptera
- Family: Formicidae
- Subfamily: Ponerinae
- Tribe: Ponerini
- Genus: Mesoponera; Emery, 1900

Type species
- Ponera melanaria Emery, 1893

Diversity
- 6 species

= Mesoponera =

Genus of ants

Mesoponera is an Old World genus of ants in the subfamily Ponerinae. It is found in the tropics, from Sub-Saharan Africa to Australia.

== Species ==
- Mesoponera australis (Forel, 1900)
- Mesoponera javana (Forel, 1905)
- Mesoponera manni (Viehmeyer, 1924)
- Mesoponera melanaria (Emery, 1893)
- Mesoponera papuana (Viehmeyer, 1914)
- Mesoponera rubra (Smith, 1857)
