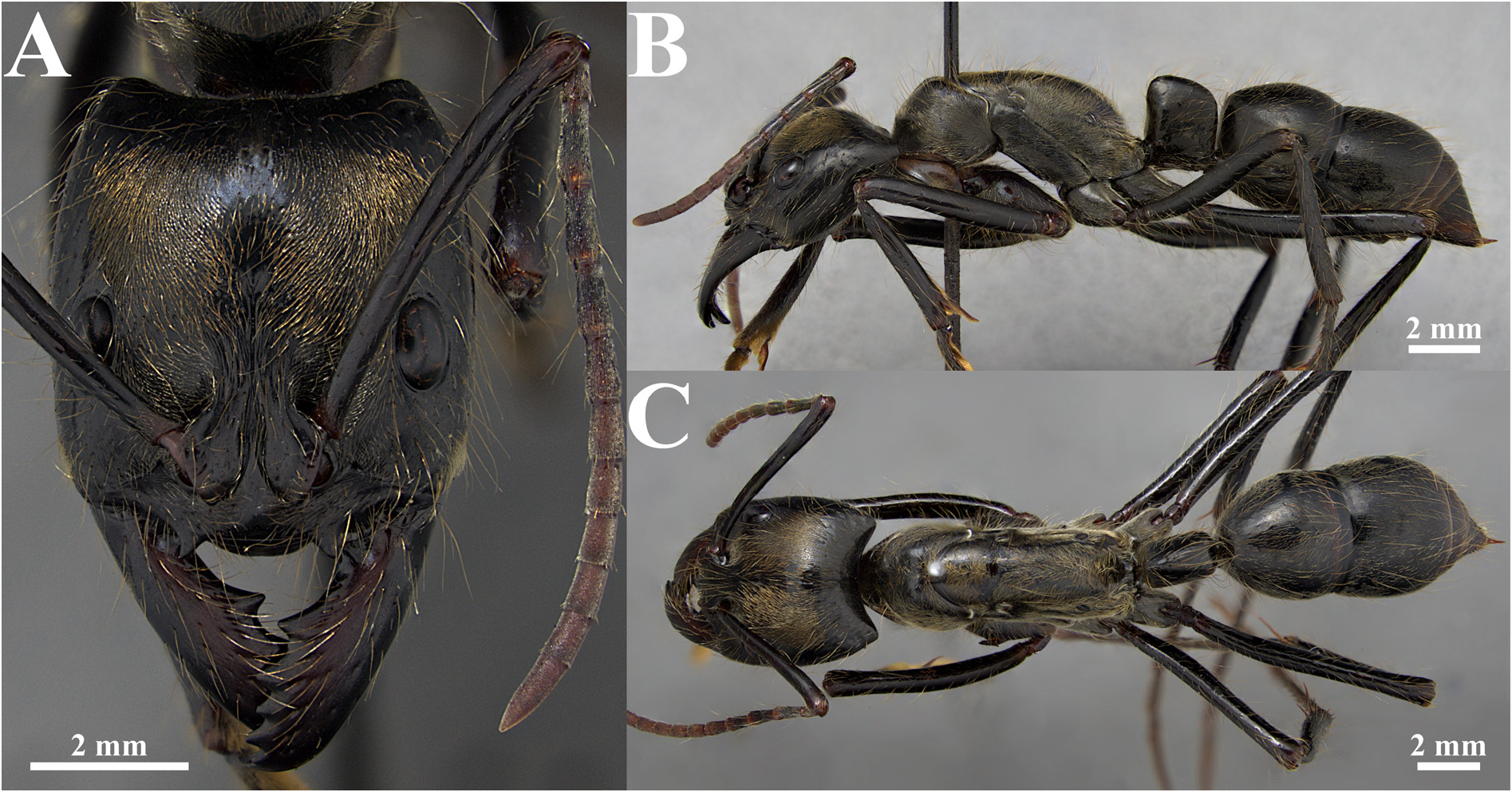

Scientific classification
- Domain: Eukaryota
- Kingdom: Animalia
- Phylum: Arthropoda
- Class: Insecta
- Order: Hymenoptera
- Family: Formicidae
- Genus: Dinoponera
- Species: D. longipes

Binomial name
- Dinoponera longipes Emery, 1901

= Dinoponera longipes =

Species of ant

Dinoponera longipes is a queenless species of ants in the subfamily Ponerinae.

== Distribution ==
Dinoponera longipes have been collected in eastern Peru in the departments of Loreto, Amazonas, Huánuco, San Martín and Pasco, as well as Ecuador in the Pastaza Province. In Colombia it has been recorded near the Peruvian border in the department of Amazonas. In Brazil, Dinoponera longipes has been found in Acre, Amazonas as far east as Manaus, as well as along the Rio Madeira in Rondônia.

== Taxonomy ==
Doubt was raised by Kempf (1971) as to whether Dinoponera longipes was a valid species. Since few specimens have been collected from western Brazil a clinal variation in character form with Dinoponera gigantea or Dinoponera mutica was a possibility. Specimens from Brazil examined by Lenhart, Dash & MacKay (2013) showed no such integration. Additionally, evidence of species validity comes from the unique morphology of the male. The nearest known locality of another species is Dinoponera gigantea 550 km away at Estirón Rio Ampiacu in the department of Loreto, Peru. There is a possibility that these could be males of a yet undiscovered species. However, relatively intensive collecting of Dinoponera in the area by numerous collectors has not revealed any other form.

== Description ==
Workers of this species can easily be recognized by the golden luster of its conspicuous long, flagellate hairs especially on the frons. In addition this species has the following combination of character states: pronotal corner rounded without tooth-like process, no gular striations, a reflective, smooth and shiny integument. All specimens have a petiole which bulges on the dorso-anterior edge except for those from the Rio Madeira and Rio Negro in Brazil.

Males can be distinguished from other Dinoponera by the following combination of character states: funiculus of antennae with short, thick decumbent setae; pygidial spine shorter than in Dinoponera gigantea and Dinoponera quadriceps but longer and narrower than in Dinoponera australis and Dinoponera snellingi, volsella with broad basal lobe covered in minute teeth.
