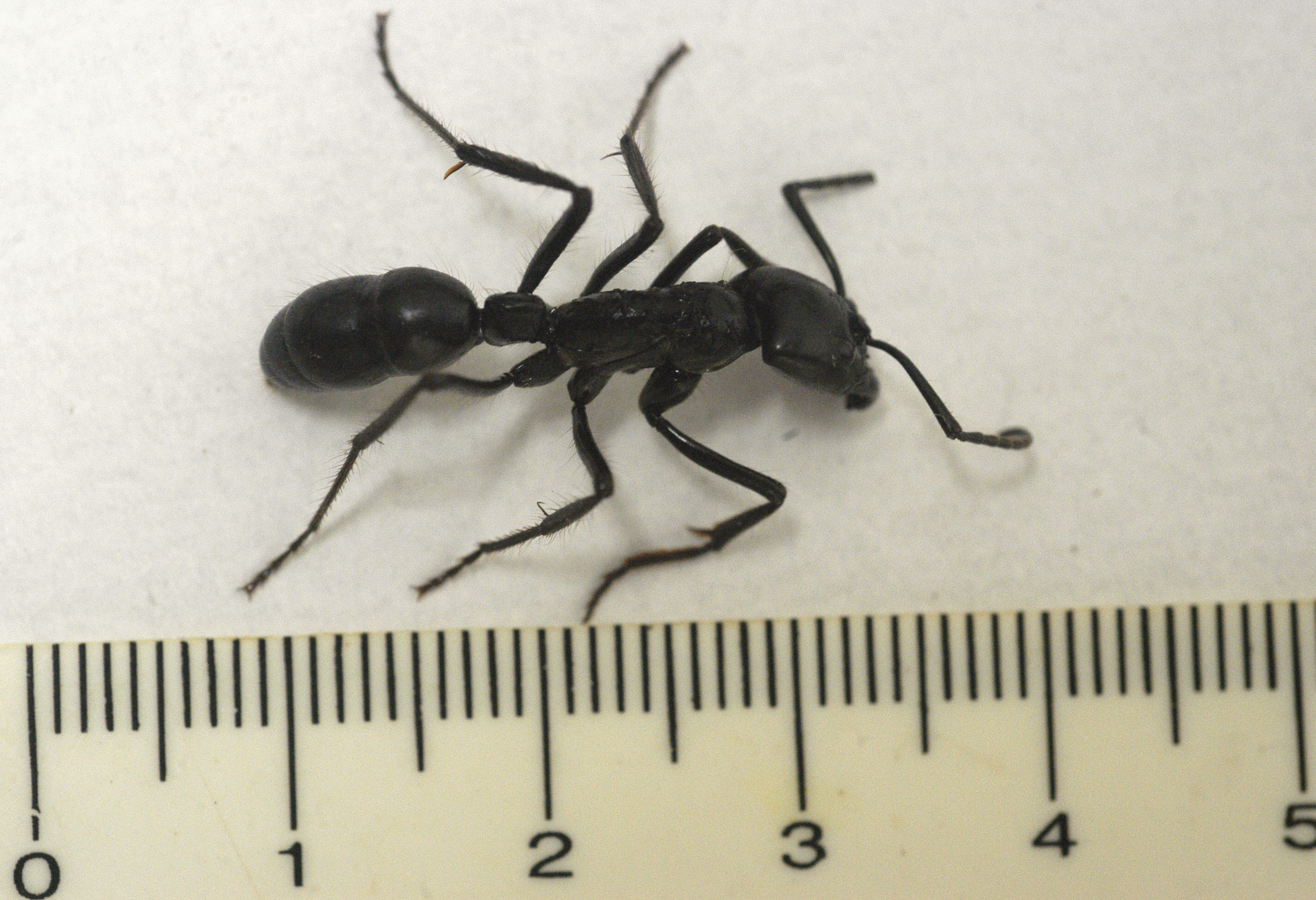
- Dinoponera quadriceps

Scientific classification
- Domain: Eukaryota
- Kingdom: Animalia
- Phylum: Arthropoda
- Class: Insecta
- Order: Hymenoptera
- Family: Formicidae
- Genus: Dinoponera
- Species: D. quadriceps

Binomial name
- Dinoponera quadriceps Kempf, 1971

= Dinoponera quadriceps =

Species of ant

Dinoponera quadriceps is a queenless species of ants in the subfamily Ponerinae. The species, known from Brazil, is similar to Dinoponera mutica and uses venom for subduing large live prey and defense. Its venom could be of use to the pharmaceutical industry.

== Distribution ==
Dinoponera quadriceps is found in the Caatingas, Cerrados, upland humid forest and Atlantic forest in the northeastern Brazilian states of Alagoas, Bahia, Ceará, Paraíba, Pernambuco and Rio Grande do Norte. Of all Dinoponera, Dinoponera quadriceps has the largest colonies with an average of 80 workers (range 26–238). Dinoponera quadriceps usually nest at the base of trees. Observations of Dinoponera quadriceps nests show that in more arid Caatinga and Cerrado habitats, nests are predominantly constructed under trees, whereas in Atlantic forest 60% of nests were 3 m away from any tree. Nests are deeper in Dinoponera quadriceps (and Dinoponera australis) than in Dinoponera gigantea, Monnin et al. (2003) suggests that deeper nests are a possible adaptation to seasons and aridity.

== Description ==
Workers of this species is recognized by its finely micro-sculptured integument which is not shiny, rounded anterior inferior pronotal corner lacking a tooth-like process, ventral side of the head lacking any gular striations and long/flagellate pilosity. Males are distinguished by the long fine setae of the second funicular segment, light brown coloration, long narrow parameres, volsella with two small basal teeth and lacking a lobe on the distal edge of digitus volsellaris.

Dinoponera quadriceps may be confused with Dinoponera mutica, but has a finely micro-sculptured integument which is not shiny, lacks gular striations and has a petiole which bulges on the dorso-anterior edge in contrast to Dinoponera mutica's roughly microsculptured integument, striated gula and petiole with even, non-bulging corners. Dinoponera quadriceps and Dinoponera mutica differ in micro-sculpturing, gular striations and petiole shape. Distribution records show a distance of over 900 km between the two species, but if specimens are found with an integration of characters in the area of Tocantins and northern Goias then these species may need to be synonymized.

== Biology ==
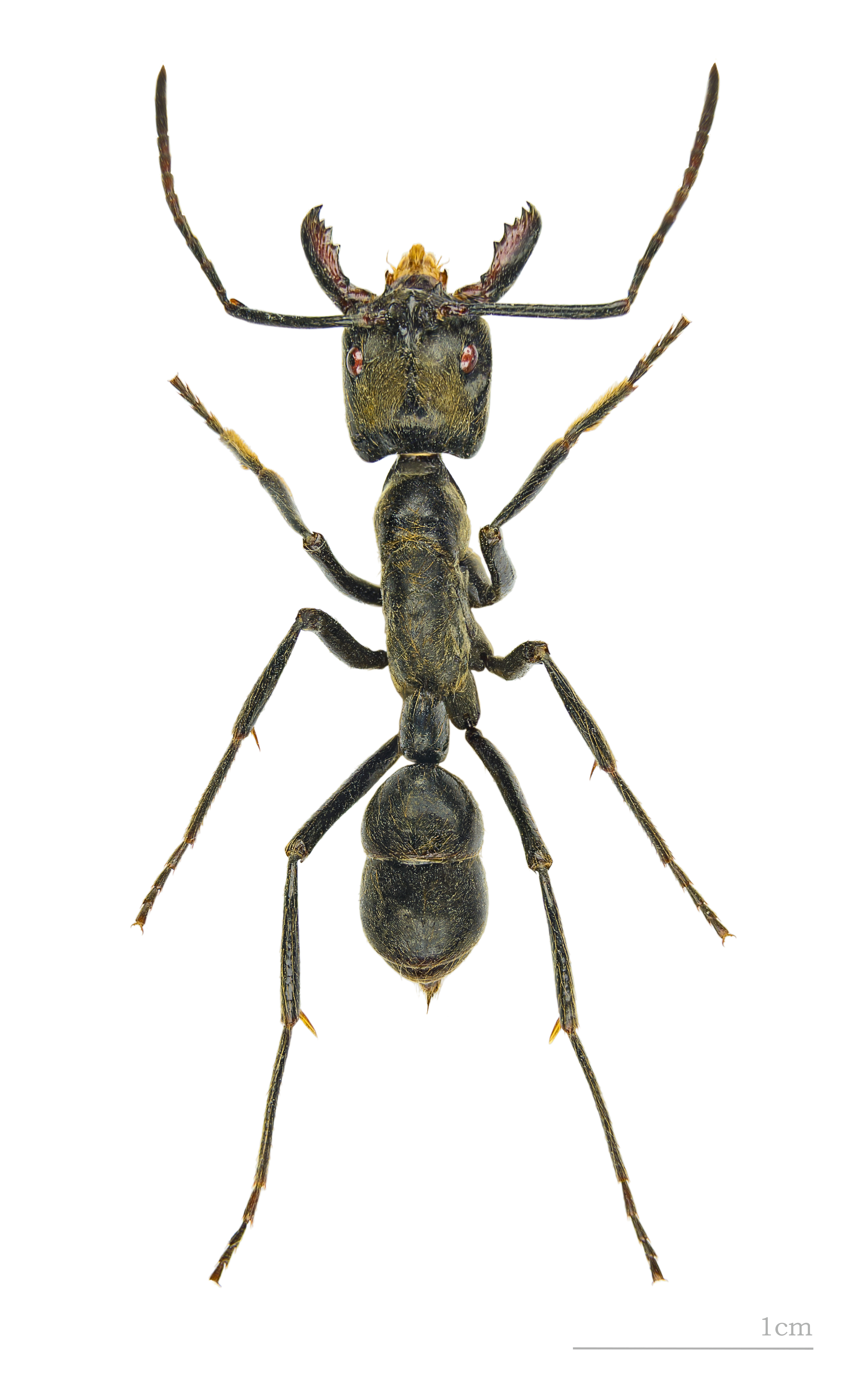
A photo of Dinoponera quadriceps showing key futures

Like other Dinoponera, Dinoponera quadriceps lacks a distinct queen caste and all individuals are morphologically similar and capable of reproduction. In Dinoponera quadriceps, dominance hierarchies tend to be relatively short where only a few individuals actively compete for reproduction. Dinoponera quadriceps has a marked seasonal pattern in activity. It is most active in May–August, the late rainy season to early dry season in the semiarid Caatinga. Activity is strongly negatively correlated to temperature and positively correlated to prey abundance. The diet Dinoponera quadriceps have been shown to be predominantly scavenged invertebrates, but include live prey, seeds and fruits. Diet seems to be very similar across the genus, regardless of habitat, and the taxonomic diversity of prey is comparable to other tropical ponerines.

=== Venom ===
For subduing large live prey and defense, workers possess a sting that has been known to cause severe pain lasting up to 48 hours. Due to the high diversity of compounds and systemic effects, venom could be of use to the pharmaceutical industry. For instance, Sousa et al. (2012) demonstrated in mice that venom from Dinoponera quadriceps had antinociceptive properties. The authors note that the local population of northeast Brazil uses dry crushed Dinoponera quadriceps ants to treat earaches, and the stings of live ants are administered for back pain and rheumatism.
