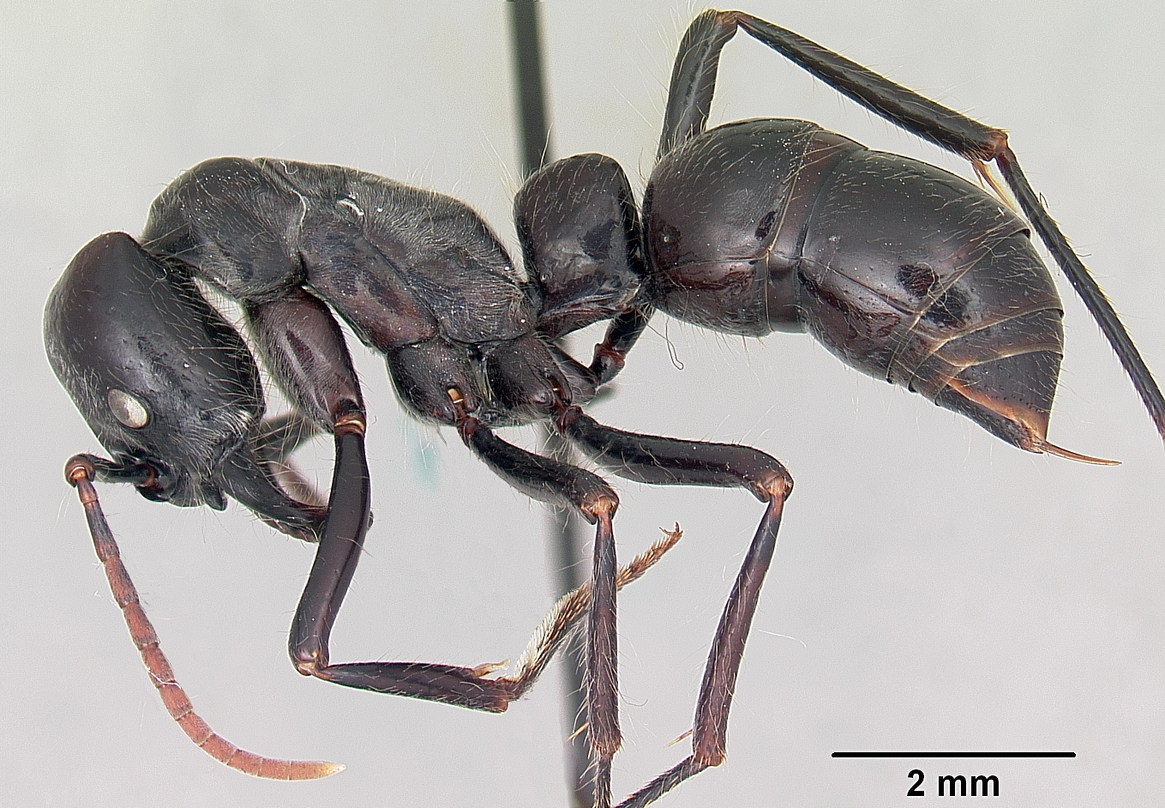
- Dinoponera lucida worker from Brazil

Scientific classification
- Domain: Eukaryota
- Kingdom: Animalia
- Phylum: Arthropoda
- Class: Insecta
- Order: Hymenoptera
- Family: Formicidae
- Genus: Dinoponera
- Species: D. lucida

Binomial name
- Dinoponera lucida Emery, 1901

= Dinoponera lucida =

Species of ant

Dinoponera lucida is a large queenless species of ant in the subfamily Ponerinae. The species, endemic to Brazil, is threatened by habitat destruction. Workers range from 27 to 30 mm in body length, which is slightly larger than the related species Dinoponera australis, but smaller than other large ants. Males are unknown.

== Distribution ==
Dinoponera lucida inhabits fragments of Atlantic rainforest in the Brazilian state of Espírito Santo, across the border into Minas Gerais, the southern portion of Bahia and São Paulo. It is possible that D. lucida exists in Rio de Janeiro. With the locality data available Dinoponera lucida is the only species with no known range overlaps with other Dinoponera species.

Dinoponera lucida has been classified as vulnerable in Brazil by the Ministry of the Environment due to habitat destruction in the Atlantic forest.

== Taxonomy ==
Lenhart, Dash & MacKay (2013) recognized Dinoponera lucida as a valid species based on the unique suite of characters including a tooth-like process on the pronotum, smooth and shiny integument, long and flagellate pilosity and petiole slanting forward on the dorsal edge. However, they note that a limited sample size restricted the certainty with which they could assert that Dinoponera lucida is a separate species because a broad spectrum of intraspecific variation may not be represented. There may be a possibility of character integration with Dinoponera australis in the area between the states of São Paulo and Rio de Janeiro. Dinoponera lucida is only slightly larger than Dinoponera australis but differs in its integument micro-sculpturing and pilosity type. Dinoponera lucida can be confused with Dinoponera australis but is distinguished by its shiny integument and whitish setae, as opposed to the micro-sculptured integument and dull tan setae of Dinoponera australis.

== Description ==
Workers of this species can be recognized by the following combination of character states: anterior inferior pronotal corner with tooth-like process, pilosity long and flagellate with white luster, integument smooth and shiny with bluish luster, scape length longer than head width, petiole slanting obliquely on dorsal edge. Total body length ranges from 27–30 mm which is between the lengths of Dinoponera australis and the other larger species.

Males are unknown.
