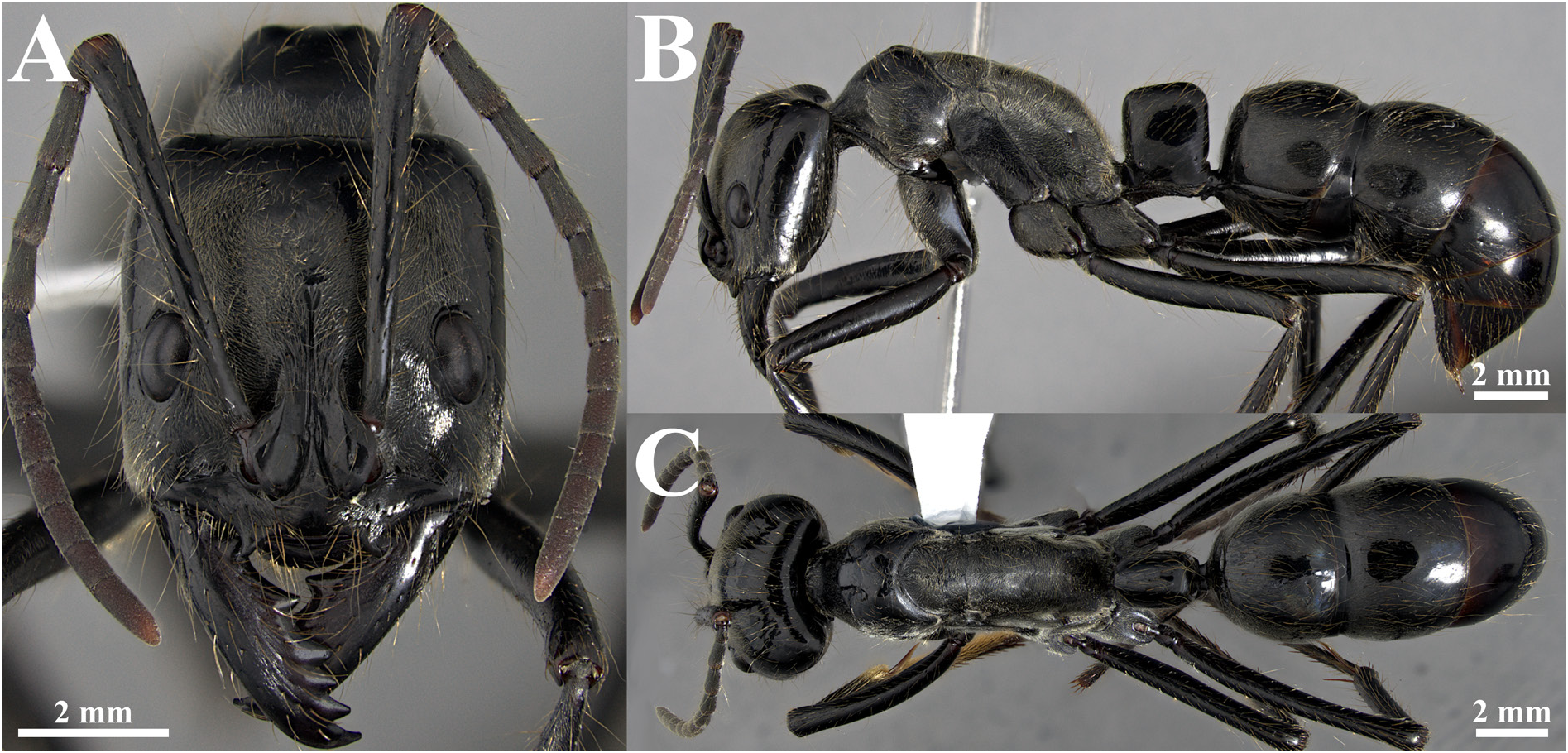

Scientific classification
- Domain: Eukaryota
- Kingdom: Animalia
- Phylum: Arthropoda
- Class: Insecta
- Order: Hymenoptera
- Family: Formicidae
- Genus: Dinoponera
- Species: D. mutica

Binomial name
- Dinoponera mutica Emery, 1901

= Dinoponera mutica =

Species of ant

Dinoponera mutica is a queenless species of ants in the subfamily Ponerinae.

== Description ==
Dinoponera mutica workers can be identified by their smooth and shiny integument with a bluish luster, a rounded pronotal corner lacking a tooth-like process, gular striations on the ventral surface of the head, long and flagellate pubescence, scape length longer than head width and petiole with even dorsal corners.

Males are unknown.

== Distribution ==
Dinoponera mutica is found in central South America in the Brazilian states of Rondônia, Mato Grosso, Goias and Mato Grosso do Sul, in eastern Bolivia and northwest Paraguay.

== Taxonomy ==
Dinoponera quadriceps is the species closest to Dinoponera mutica in terms of morphological characters. Dinoponera quadriceps has a finely micro-sculptured integument which is not shiny, lacks gular striations and has a petiole which bulges on the dorso-anterior edge. Dinoponera longipes and Dinoponera hispida may also be confused with Dinoponera mutica but this species lacks the dense golden pubescence of the former, or the short, stiff setae and forward bulging petiole of the latter.
