= Dinoponera snellingi =

Scientific classification
- Domain: Eukaryota
- Kingdom: Animalia
- Phylum: Arthropoda
- Class: Insecta
- Order: Hymenoptera
- Family: Formicidae
- Genus: Dinoponera
- Species: D. snellingi

Binomial name
- Dinoponera snellingi Lenhart, Dash & Mackay, 2013

Species of ant

Dinoponera snellingi (named after Roy Snelling) is a queenless species of ants in the subfamily Ponerinae. The species is known only from type locality in Campo Grande, Brazil.

In 2021, the species name was demoted to a synonym of Dinoponera grandis.

== Description ==
Workers are unknown.

Male specimens of this species are distinct in several respects. The combination of a bicolored body and head possessing bulging compound eyes and ocelli is unique to this species. More definitive is the shape of the aedeagus which possesses a large ventral lobe and finger-like serrated flange. The short broad digitus volsellaris with finely toothed basal lobe is distinctive, as well as the paramere shape.
