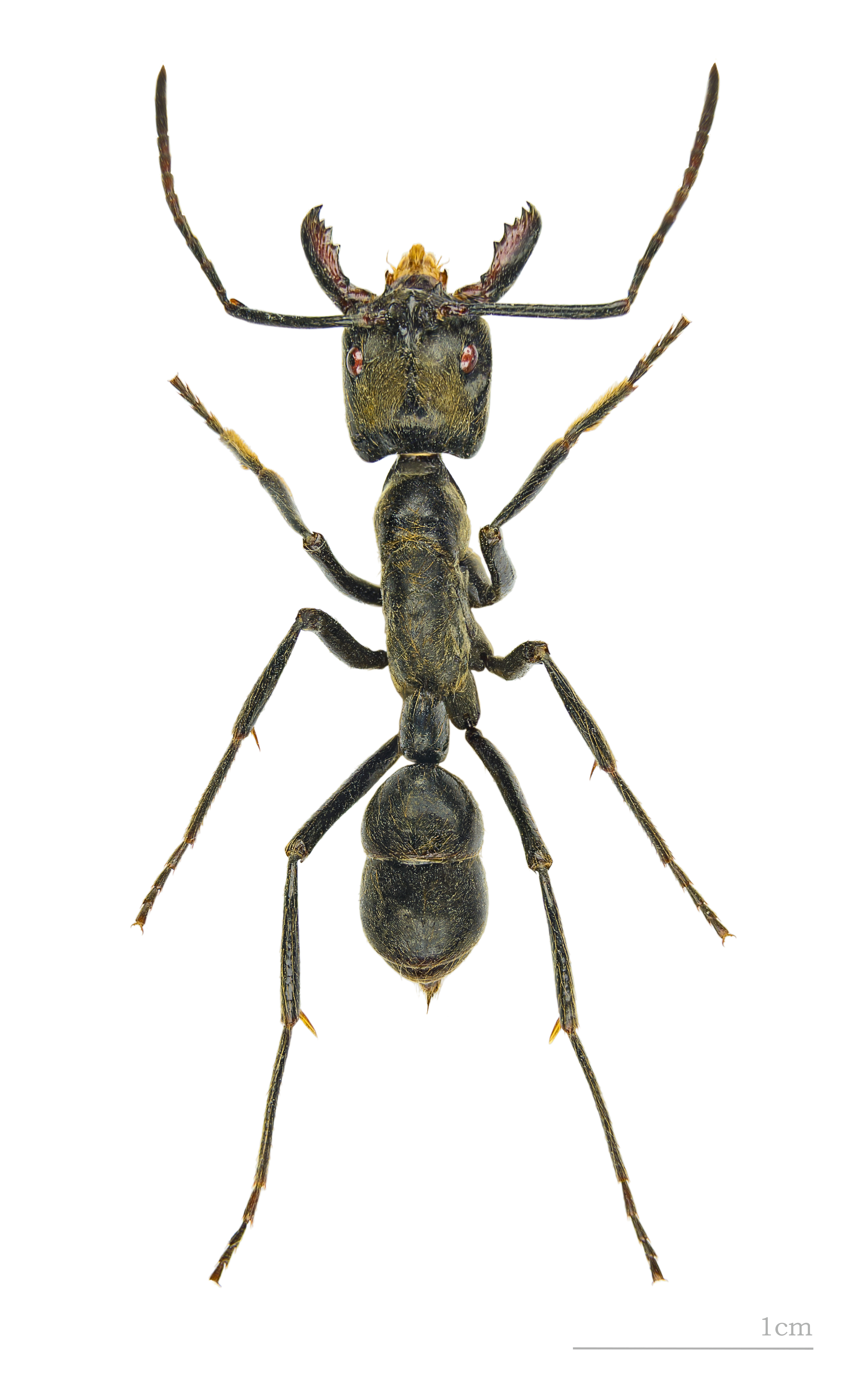
- Dinoponera quadriceps – MHNT

Scientific classification
- Kingdom: Animalia
- Phylum: Arthropoda
- Clade: Pancrustacea
- Class: Insecta
- Order: Hymenoptera
- Family: Formicidae
- Subfamily: Ponerinae
- Tribe: Ponerini
- Alliance: Pachycondyla genus group
- Genus: Dinoponera; Roger, 1861

Type species
- Ponera grandis Guérin-Méneville, 1838

Diversity
- 8 species

= Dinoponera =

Genus of ants

Dinoponera is a strictly South American genus of ant in the subfamily Ponerinae, commonly called tocandiras or giant Amazonian ants. These ants are generally less well known than Paraponera clavata, the bullet ant, yet Dinoponera females may surpass 3–4 cm (1.2–1.6 in) in total body length, making them among the largest ants in the world.

== Names ==
Dinoponera (tocandira ants) are known as piata in many Tucanoan languages.

== Species ==
- Dinoponera gigantea Perty, 1833
- Dinoponera grandis Guérin-Méneville, 1838
- Dinoponera hispida Lenhart, Dash & Mackay, 2013
- Dinoponera longipes Emery, 1901
- Dinoponera lucida Emery, 1901
- Dinoponera mutica Emery, 1901
- Dinoponera nicinha Dias & Lattke, 2021
- Dinoponera quadriceps Kempf, 1971

== Distribution ==
Dinoponera is a strictly South American genus, and has been found from montane rainforest on the eastern slope of the Andes in Peru, Ecuador and Colombia to savannah and lowland rainforest in Brazil, Guyana, south through Bolivia, Paraguay and Argentina. Dinoponera australis, known from Bolivia, Brazil, Paraguay and Argentina, has the widest known range of all Dinoponera species.

== Size ==
Dinoponera contains one of the largest species of ants in the world, with female Dinoponera gigantea specimens measuring 3–4 cm (1.2–1.6 in) in length. Size is the most obvious characteristic distinguishing Dinoponera from other genera. The only other ants with a worker caste approaching this size are Paraponera clavata (the bullet ant) and the larger Pachycondyla such as P. crassinoda, P. impressa and P. villosa. Paraponera clavata is easily identified by its anvil-shaped petiole with a spine on the ventral surface, highly sculptured body and deep antennal scrobes. Pachycondyla is regarded as the sister taxa to Dinoponera. Dinoponera, in addition to their size, are distinguishable from Pachycondyla by the presence of two laterally projecting clypeal teeth and rows of spines on the pygidium and hypopygidium.

== Reproduction ==
Dinoponera is one of the roughly 10 ponerine genera in which some species have secondarily lost the typical morphologically specialized queen caste for a reproductive worker known as a gamergate. Conflict over dominance is intense in colonies, with younger workers usually joining a linear hierarchy of one to five workers depending on colony size. The gamergate, or alpha female, has the highest ranking. The alpha female mates with non-nestmate males at night at the entrance of the nest. After copulation the female bites through the male's gaster to release herself and pulls out the genital capsule, which acts as a temporary sperm plug. After mating the female is unreceptive to other males and remains monandrous. The gamergate maintains dominance with ritualized behaviors such as antennal boxing and biting, "blocking", as well as gaster rubbing and curling.

Alpha females may "sting smear" a competing female with secretions from the Dufour's gland, triggering the lower-ranking workers to immobilize the marked female. Subordinate females (beta, gamma or delta) may produce unfertilized eggs but these are usually consumed by the alpha female in a form of "queen policing".

Males are born throughout most of the year in tropical species; however, Dinoponera australis, which lives in the more temperate south, was found to produce males only in May–July. When the alpha declines reproductively or dies, she is replaced by a high-ranking worker.

== Foraging ==
Workers lower in the hierarchy forage individually for food items on the substrate and do not recruit other nestmates to assist with food transport. Although foraging workers do not recruit nestmates, Nascimento et al. (2012) found a positive feedback between incoming food and stimulation of new foragers as well as task partitioning once food was brought into the nest. Lower-ranking females processed protein resources while higher-ranking females handled small food pieces and distributed them to the larvae. Fourcassié & Oliviera (2002) found Dinoponera gigantea foraging to be concentrated in the early morning and afternoon but did not sample at night. Morgan (1993) observed the highest activity at night in Dinoponera longipes. Dinoponera quadriceps has a marked seasonal pattern in activity. It is most active in May–August, the late rainy season to early dry season in the semiarid Caatinga. Activity was strongly negatively correlated to temperature and positively correlated to prey abundance. The diets of both Dinoponera gigantea and Dinoponera quadriceps have been shown to be predominantly scavenged invertebrates, but include live prey, seeds and fruits. Araújo & Rodrigues (2006) state that the taxonomic diversity of prey is comparable to other tropical ponerines, but has an optimal prey size of 2–3 cm in Dinoponera. Diet seems to be very similar across the genus, regardless of habitat.

== Predators and pathogens ==
Despite their large size and strong venom, Dinoponera are likely preyed on by many vertebrate and invertebrate species across South America. Like many other ant species, Dinoponera can be infected by the entomopathogenic fungi Cordyceps sp. Buys et al. (2010) discovered a Kapala sp. eucharitid wasp emerging from the puparia of Dinoponera lucida.

== Venom ==
For subduing large live prey and defense, workers possess a sting that has been known to cause severe pain lasting up to 48 hours. Lymphadenopathy, edema, tachycardia and fresh blood appearing in human victim feces are common symptoms. In some ant specimens the venom sac is empty. Workers may have 60–75 unique proteinaceous components in the venom. The convoluted gland within the venom system of Dinoponera australis has been found to possess close similarities to those of vespine wasps. The contents of Dinoponera australis venom have been found to be similar to those of Pachycondyla spp. Due to the high diversity of compounds and systemic effects, venom of Dinoponera could be of use to the pharmaceutical industry. For instance, Sousa et al. (2012) demonstrated in mice that venom from Dinoponera quadriceps had antinociceptive properties. The authors note that the local population of northeast Brazil uses dry crushed Dinoponera quadriceps ants to treat earaches, and the stings of live ants are administered for back pain and rheumatism.

== Colonies ==
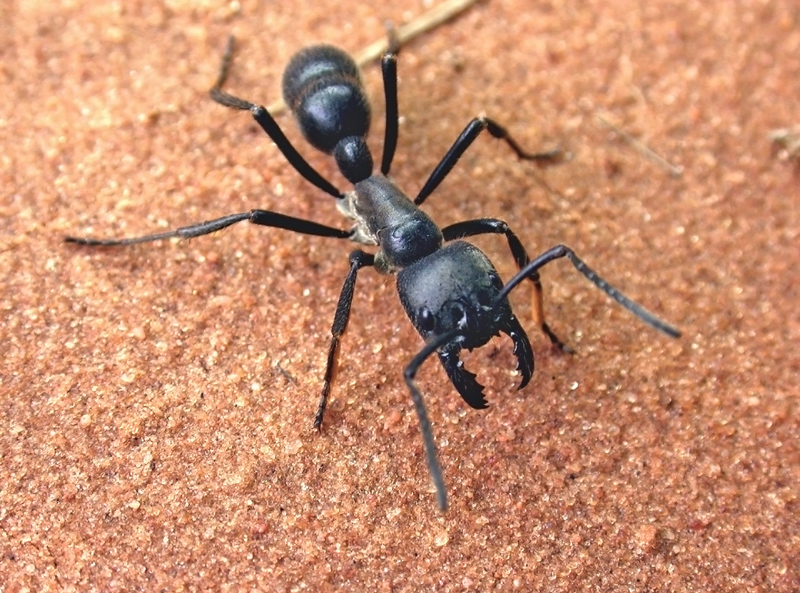
Dinoponera australis, one of the world's largest ants

Colonies vary in size depending upon species, but generally consist of fewer than 100 individuals. Dinoponera australis colonies have an average of 14 workers (range 3–37), Dinoponera gigantea averages 41 workers (range 30–96), and Dinoponera quadriceps has the largest colonies, with an average of 80 workers (range 26–238).

New colonies are founded by fission, a process in which a beta female is fertilized in the natal nest. This new alpha female then leaves the nest with a cohort of workers to found an incipient colony, sometimes employing tandem running.

=== Nests ===
The nest consists of large chambers and tunnels in the soil, sometimes with an earthen mound, and can be 0.10–1.2 m deep. Nests are deeper in Dinoponera australis and Dinoponera quadriceps than in Dinoponera gigantea. Monnin et al. (2003) suggests that deeper nests are a possible adaptation to seasons and aridity. Dinoponera gigantea nests may have up to eight entrances and can be weakly polydomous, whereas 1–30 openings, with an average of 11, were recorded for Dinoponera longipes. Nesting density and spatial distribution varies depending on habitat. Density ranges from 15–40 nests per ha to 80 nests per ha. Morgan (1993) measured a spacing between nests for Dinoponera longipes with a median of 35 m (n=22, range 14–69.5 m). Dinoponera australis and Dinoponera gigantea usually nest at the base of trees. Observations of Dinoponera quadriceps nests show that in more arid Caatinga and Cerrado habitats, nests are predominantly constructed under trees, whereas in Atlantic forest 60% of nests were 3 m away from any tree.
