= Acidopore =

Anatomical feature of an ant

The acidopore is a component of ant anatomy; a round orifice located on the abdomen encircled by hairs which typifies the subfamily Formicinae. The conical structure connects to the posterior end of an ant's gaster where formic acid and other hydrocarbons are formed, collectively comprising the venom. Ants are able to disinfect fungus-infected brood by taking up acidopore venom into their mouth by self-grooming and applying it by brood grooming. This structure is unique to, but not present in all members of the ant subfamily Formicinae. It is termed an acidopore because it is the pore, or hole, from which formic acid is sprayed.

== See also ==
- Ant venom
