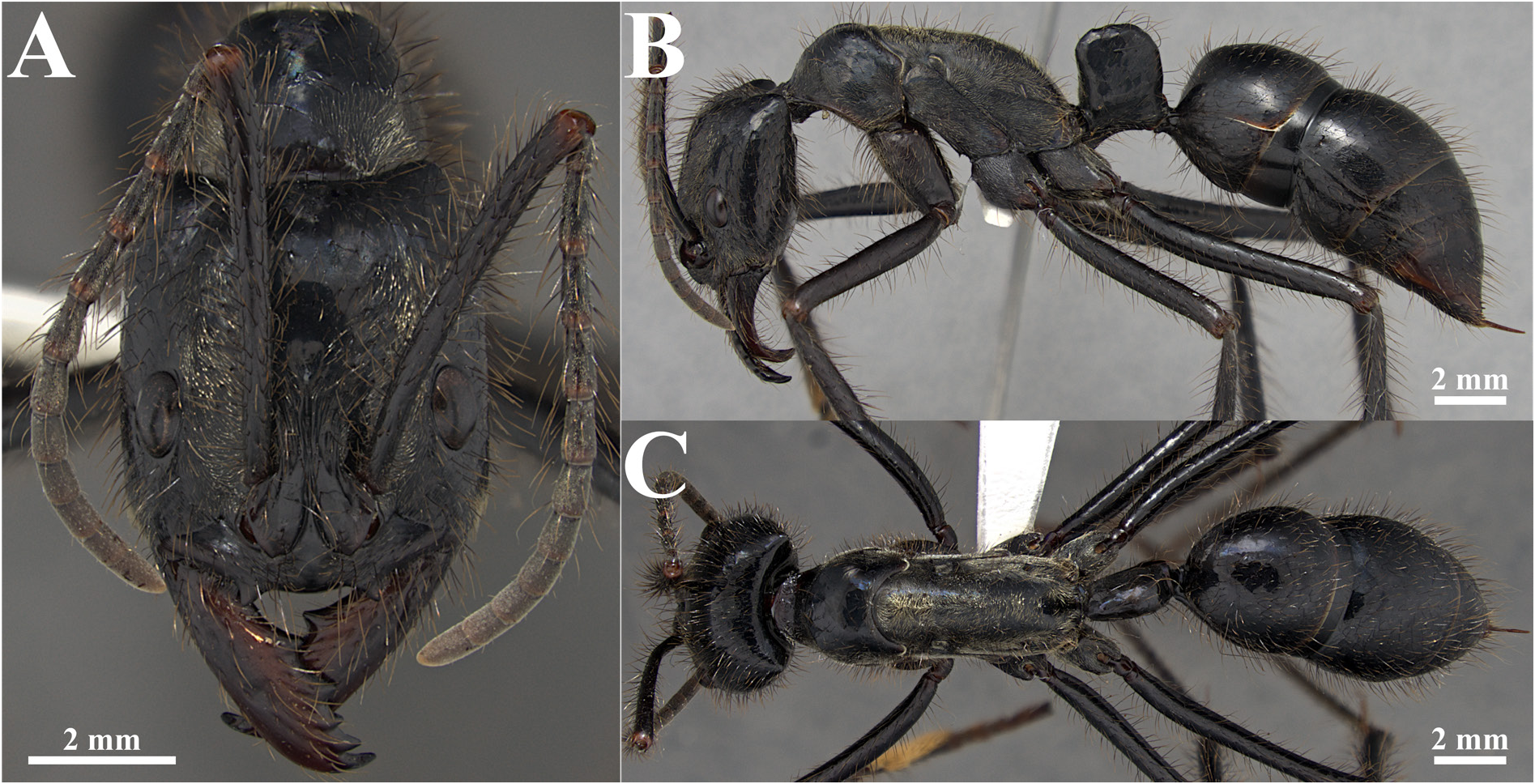

Scientific classification
- Domain: Eukaryota
- Kingdom: Animalia
- Phylum: Arthropoda
- Class: Insecta
- Order: Hymenoptera
- Family: Formicidae
- Genus: Dinoponera
- Species: D. hispida

Binomial name
- Dinoponera hispida Lenhart, Dash & Mackay, 2013

= Dinoponera hispida =

Species of ant

Dinoponera hispida (hispida, from the Latin hispidus: bristle, referring to the conspicuous bristle-like setae covering the body) is a queenless species of ants in the subfamily Ponerinae. The species is known only from the type locality in Tucuruí, Pará, Brazil.

== Description ==
Workers can be distinguished from other species by the following combination of character states: conspicuous bristle-like setae covering the entire body but most pronounced on the dorsum of the head, mesosoma, petiole and gaster; fine striations on dorsum of the head; integument smooth and shiny with bluish luster most visible on sides of the head; antero–inferior corner of pronotum without tooth-like process; petiole bulging at antero-dorsal corner; insertions of setae on dorsum of petiole raised, papillate.

Males are unknown.
