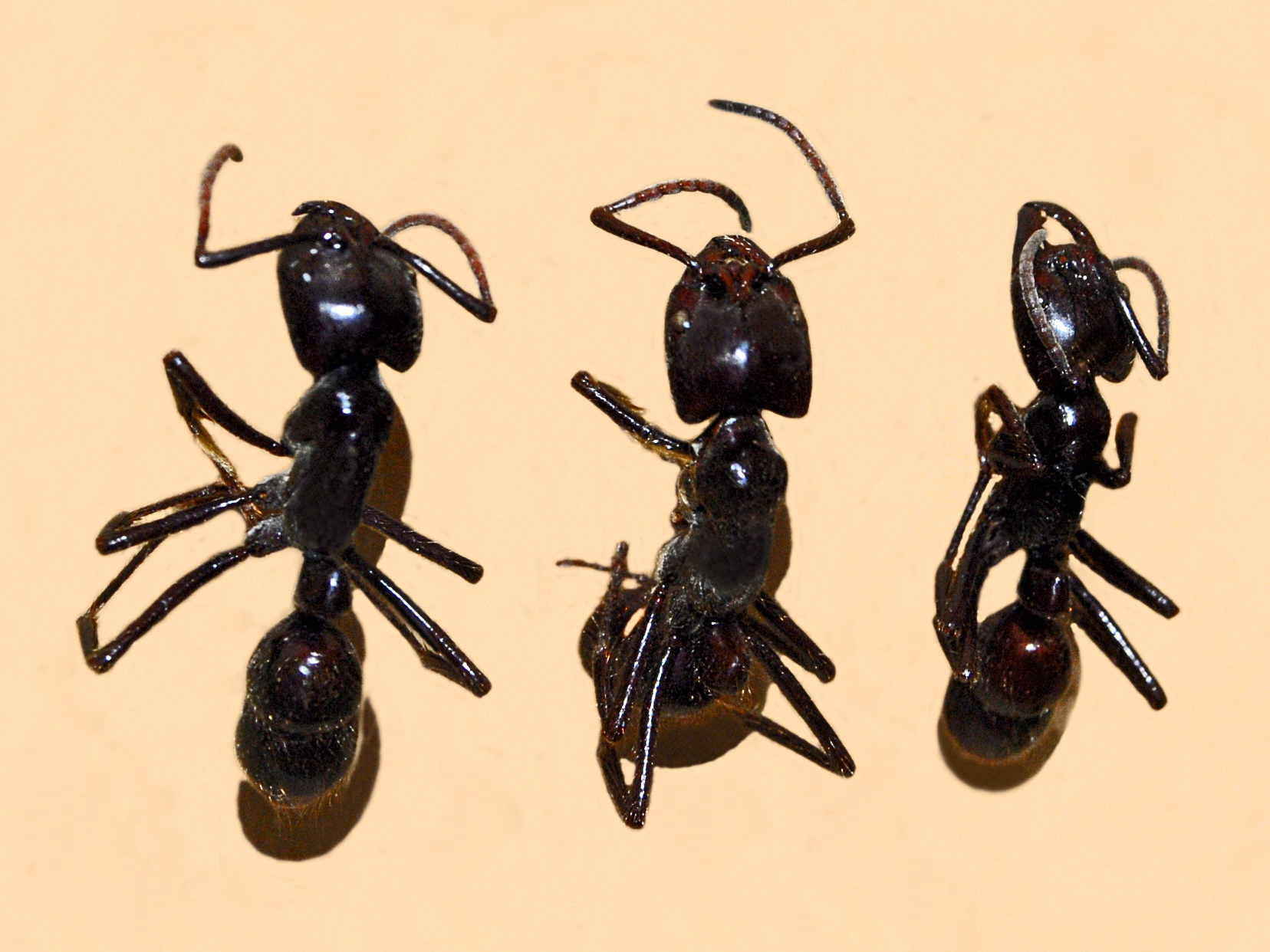
- Dinoponera gigantea. Museum specimen

Scientific classification
- Kingdom: Animalia
- Phylum: Arthropoda
- Class: Insecta
- Order: Hymenoptera
- Family: Formicidae
- Genus: Dinoponera
- Species: D. gigantea

Binomial name
- Dinoponera gigantea (Perty, 1833)

Synonyms
- Ponera grandis Guérin-Méneville, 1838; Ponera gigantea Perty, 1833

= Dinoponera gigantea =

Species of ant

Dinoponera gigantea is a species of ant belonging to the family Formicidae.

It is called taramãçu or uitsi in the Kwaza language of Rondônia, Brazil.

== Description ==
Dinoponera gigantea is one of the world's largest species of ant. The females of the species are larger than males, with lengths ranging from 3 to 4 centimetres (1.2 to 1.6 in). The females are coal-black in color, while the much smaller males are dark red.

== Distribution ==
Dinoponera gigantea is present only in South America. It has been found on the coast of Guyana, in the Brazilian states of Amazonas, Pará including Marajo Island, Mato Grosso, Mato Grosso do Sul, Ceará and Maranhão as well as the Loreto Province in Peru. Dinoponera gigantea is reported to be common in un-flooded forests in the vicinity of Belém, Pará. It is probable that Dinoponera gigantea is found in French Guiana, Suriname, Venezuela and southeastern Colombia because these regions are adjacent to known Dinoponera gigantea localities and have similar lowland rainforest habitat.

== Nesting ==
D. gigantea colonies have as many as eight entrances to their underground chambers, each being 3 to 8 centimetres (1.2 to 3.1 in) in diameter. The entrances are, as is typical for ants, surrounded by the soil removed to make the nest, but, in contrast with other species, no mound is formed. Nests have been found to be about 40 centimetres (16 in) deep, with chambers approximately 3 centimetres (1.2 in) in height and 20 centimetres (7.9 in) in width.

At least in some instances, the species is polydomous, with a single colony occupying and maintaining more than one nest at a time. Some instances of this were recorded in Fourcassie and Oliveira's 2002 study, which found colonies using multiple nests, the entrances of which were 40 to 250 centimetres (1.3 to 8.2 ft) apart.

== Foraging ==
Activity outside the nest is highest at sunrise and sunset, though it is likely that some activity occurs at night. Individuals search for food alone, generally within about 10 metres (33 ft) of the nest. Items brought back range from 10 to 400 milligrams, and are of wide variety, including both plant and animal matter. Food items include fruits of vismia plants, inga seeds, and various small animals such as spiders, crickets, and snails. A relatively small number, around 10%, of foraging trips turn out to be successful. Successful foraging trips are typically thirty to sixty minutes in duration, but may run as long as three hours.

== Territorialism ==
Neighboring colonies of D. gigantea have distinct foraging areas. On the occasion that ants from different colonies meet on the border of these areas, the individuals face each other, locking their mandibles. The two then repeatedly poke each other's head with their antennae while kicking with the forelegs. At some point, one of the ants gains a dominant position, eventually biting the other on the top of the head and pressing the gaster against the loser's body. The entire encounter can last up to half an hour. In Fourcassie and Oliveira's study, both ants were invariably found to be uninjured.

== See also ==
- Dinomyrmex
- Titanomyrma
