= Ant venom =

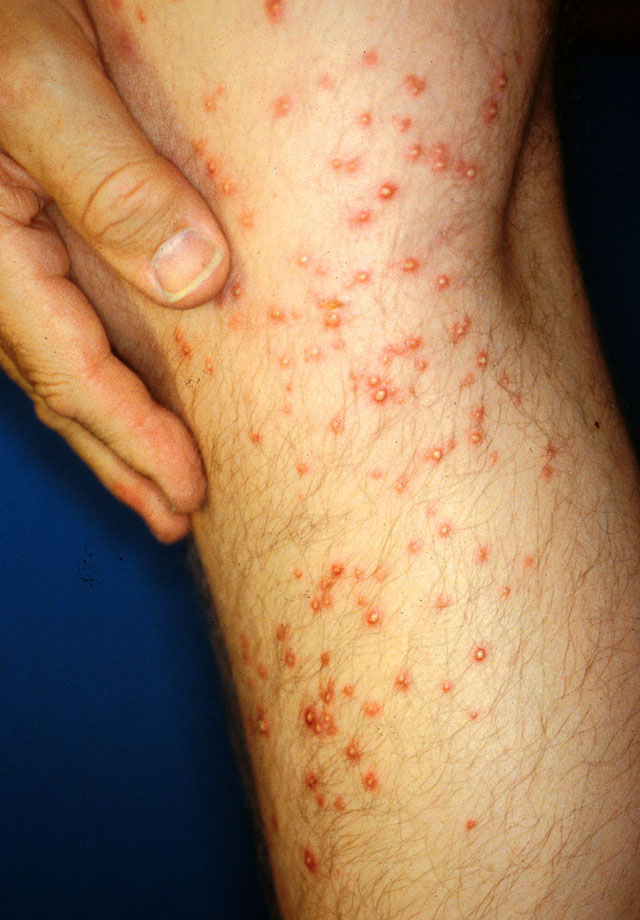
- Sterile pustules 3 days after fire ant stings.
- Specialty: Emergency medicine

Ant venom is any of, or a mixture of, irritants and toxins inflicted by ants. Most ants spray or inject a venom, the main constituent of which is formic acid only in the case of subfamily Formicinae.

== Ant stings ==
Of all extant ant species, about 71% are considered to be stinging species. Notable examples include a few species of medical importance, such as Solenopsis (fire ants), Pachycondyla, Myrmecia (bulldog ants), and Paraponera (bullet ants). In the case of fire ants, the venom consists mainly of alkaloid (>95%) and protein (<1%) components. Stinging ants cause a cutaneous condition that is different from that caused by biting venomous ants. Particularly painful are stings from fire ants, although the bullet ant's sting is considered by some to be the most painful insect sting. Some subfamilies have evolutionarily lost the ability to sting.

== Geographical prevalence ==
The geographical prevalence of ant venom is closely linked to the global distribution of ant species. Different types of ants dominate specific regions of the world. In the southeastern United States, along with parts of South America and Central America, fire ants from the Solenopsis are a major source of medically significant sting incidents. Originally native to South America, Solenopsis invicta (red fire ants) and Solenopsis richteri (black fire ants) are believed to have first arrived to the United States in the early 1900s near Mobile, Alabama. Since then they have spread across 14 states, primarily throughout the southeast region of the United States, and Puerto Rico. Beyond the United States, fire ants have also established populations in China, Taiwan, Australia, New Zealand, Trinidad, and Italy. With climate change contributing to this, they can further expand their range into broader parts of Asia.

In Australia, a species from the genus Myrmecia can be primarily found to be responsible for the majority of serious ant sting reactions, accounting for 89% of ant sting anaphylaxis cases nationwide. The Jumper ant is responsible for 57% of all ant sting anaphylaxis incidents in one large nationwide study. In East Asia, the Asian needle ant has been documented as a cause of sting anaphylaxis, while in the Middle East, the Samsum ant has similarly been documented as a cause of sting anaphylaxis. In North America, Pogonomyrmex species can be found in arid regions. These regional differences highlight the global public health significance of ant venom, affecting millions of people across multiple continents.

== Clinical reactions ==
Ant venom can produce a range of clinical reactions, varying in severity depending on the type of ant and the individual's sensitivity to the venom. Primarily composed of proteins, peptides, and alkaloids, the different components of ant venom play distinct roles in causing reactions. Reactions can range from mild local responses at the sting site to severe, life-threatening anaphylaxis.

=== Local reactions ===
The most common reaction, the sting site experiences an immediate burning sensation. Within an hour, a red welt will typically form, followed by fluid-filled vesicles within a couple of hours. After 24 hours the burning sensation should no longer be present, and the vesicles develop into sterile pustules, which are caused by the alkaloid in the venom. These pustules should not be popped or scratched; doing so could lead to secondary bacterial infections and scarring. The reaction typically resolves itself within 7 to 10 days.

=== Large local reactions ===
More extensive than the normal local reaction, this reaction is characterized by swelling larger than 10 centimeters beyond the sting site, accompanied by redness and pain. For example, a single sting could spread across your whole limb. Reactions typically last between 42 and 72 hours.

=== Systemic reactions ===
occur when the body responds to ant venom beyond the sting site. Symptoms include hives, flushing, nausea, vomiting, dizziness, and difficulty breathing. These reactions are triggered by the protein allergens present in ant venom. Systemic reactions occur in approximately 0.5% to 2% of people stung and can develop rapidly following a sting. Individuals who have been previously stung are at higher risk of developing systemic reactions due to sensitization from prior exposure.

=== Anaphylaxis ===
The most severe reaction from ant venom that can be life-threatening if not treated promptly. Symptoms include a sudden drop in blood pressure, loss of consciousness, severe swelling, and cardiac arrest. This reaction occurs in approximately 2% of people stung and typically develops within minutes of the sting. Individuals with systemic mastocytosis face a significantly higher risk of severe and fatal Anaphylaxis from ant stings. Nearly 50% of ant sting anaphylaxis episodes are not initially recognized or treated with epinephrine. Ant sting Anaphylaxis accounts for up to 43% of Anaphylaxis cases and 20% of anaphylaxis related fatalities in areas where stinging ants are endemic.

== Treatments ==
First aid for fire ant bites includes external treatments and oral medicines.

- External treatments: a topical steroid cream (hydrocortisone), or one containing Aloe vera
- Oral medicines: antihistamines
- Applying zinc oxide or calamine lotion.

Severe allergic reactions can be caused by ant stings in particular and venomous stings in general, including severe chest pain, nausea, severe sweating, loss of breath, serious swelling, fever, dizziness, and slurred speech; they can be fatal if not treated.

== See also ==
- Acidopore
- Poneratoxin, the neurotoxic component of bullet ant venom
- Pulicosis (flea bites)
- Skin lesion
- Solenopsin, the primary toxin in fire ant venom
