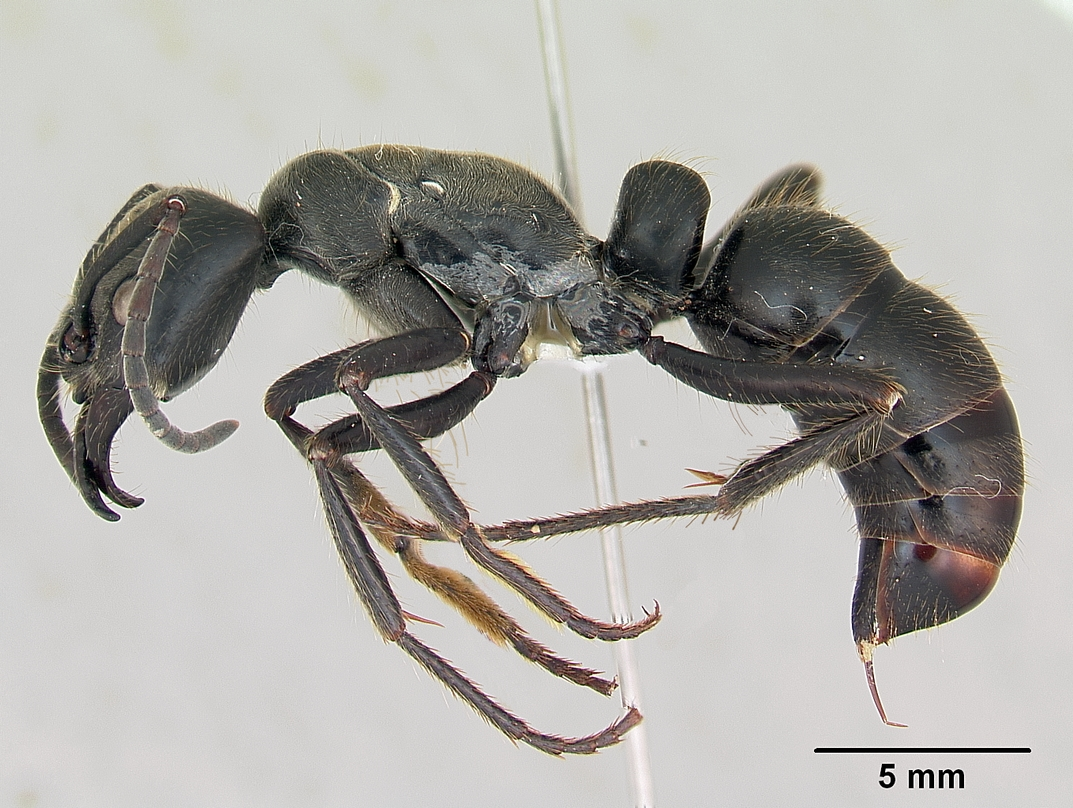

Scientific classification
- Kingdom: Animalia
- Phylum: Arthropoda
- Clade: Pancrustacea
- Class: Insecta
- Order: Hymenoptera
- Family: Formicidae
- Genus: Dinoponera
- Species: D. grandis

Binomial name
- Dinoponera grandis Guérin-Méneville, 1838

Subspecies
- See text

= Dinoponera grandis =

Species of ant

Dinoponera grandis is a species of ant notable for its lack of distinct queen caste.

The species Dinoponera australis was synonymised under Dinoponera grandis.

== Subspecies ==
Dinoponera grandis is synonymised with D. australis' three subspecies:

- Dinoponera australis australis Emery, 1901
- Dinoponera australis bucki Borgmeier, 1937
- Dinoponera australis nigricolor Borgmeier, 1937

== Description ==
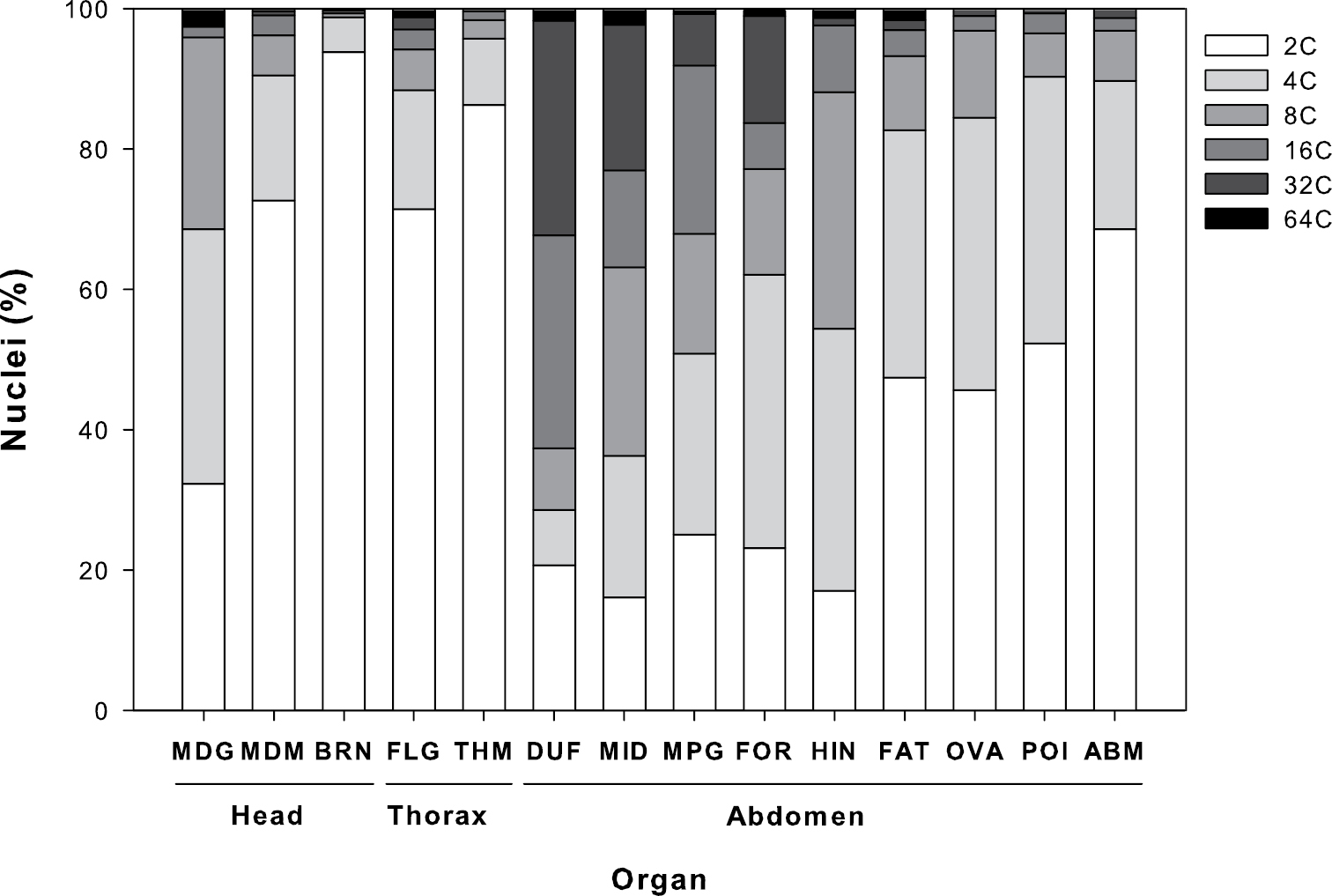
Organ-specific patterns of endopolyploidy (from x2 to x64) in Dinoponera australis

Studies have shown that fat storage in this species is related to the division of labour in the colony and non-reproductive individuals are characterized with a lower lipid count than reproductives.

Dinoponera australis has been found to exhibit marked differences in the degree of polyploidy across its tissues, ranging from 2 to 64 copies of the nuclear genome.

== Distribution ==
Dinoponera australis has the widest known range of the Dinoponera. This species is found in the department of Santa Cruz in Bolivia, southern Brazil in the states of Mato Grosso, Goiás, Minas Gerais, São Paulo, Mato Grosso do Sul, Paraná, Santa Catarina and Rio Grande do Sul, eastern Paraguay in the departments of Itapúa, Alto Paraná and Guairá, as well as the province of Misiones in Argentina.
