= Myrmica winterae =

Conservation status
- Vulnerable (IUCN 2.3)

Scientific classification
- Kingdom: Animalia
- Phylum: Arthropoda
- Class: Insecta
- Order: Hymenoptera
- Family: Formicidae
- Subfamily: Myrmicinae
- Genus: Myrmica
- Species: M. winterae

Binomial name
- Myrmica winterae (Kutter, 1973)

Species of ant

Myrmica winterae is a species of ant in the genus Myrmica. It is native to Switzerland.
