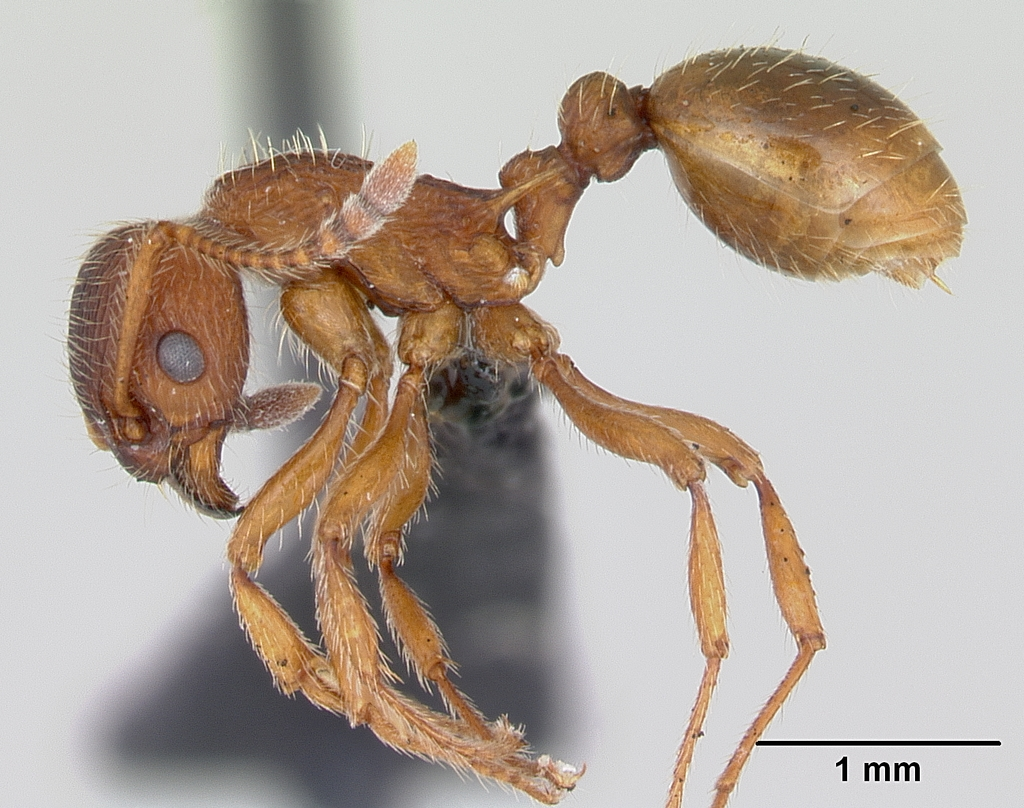
- worker

Scientific classification
- Domain: Eukaryota
- Kingdom: Animalia
- Phylum: Arthropoda
- Class: Insecta
- Order: Hymenoptera
- Family: Formicidae
- Subfamily: Myrmicinae
- Genus: Myrmica
- Species: M. gallienii

Binomial name
- Myrmica gallienii Bondroit, 1920

= Myrmica gallienii =

Species of ant

Myrmica gallienii is an ant species distributed from Central Europe to West Siberia. Also found in Sweden, Finland, Hungary, Bulgaria and Romania. It lives in wet grasslands and swamps, often in saline land. It builds shallow nests with a soil mound in moist habitats but deep nests in sandy areas. Colonies are relatively large with thousands of individuals.
