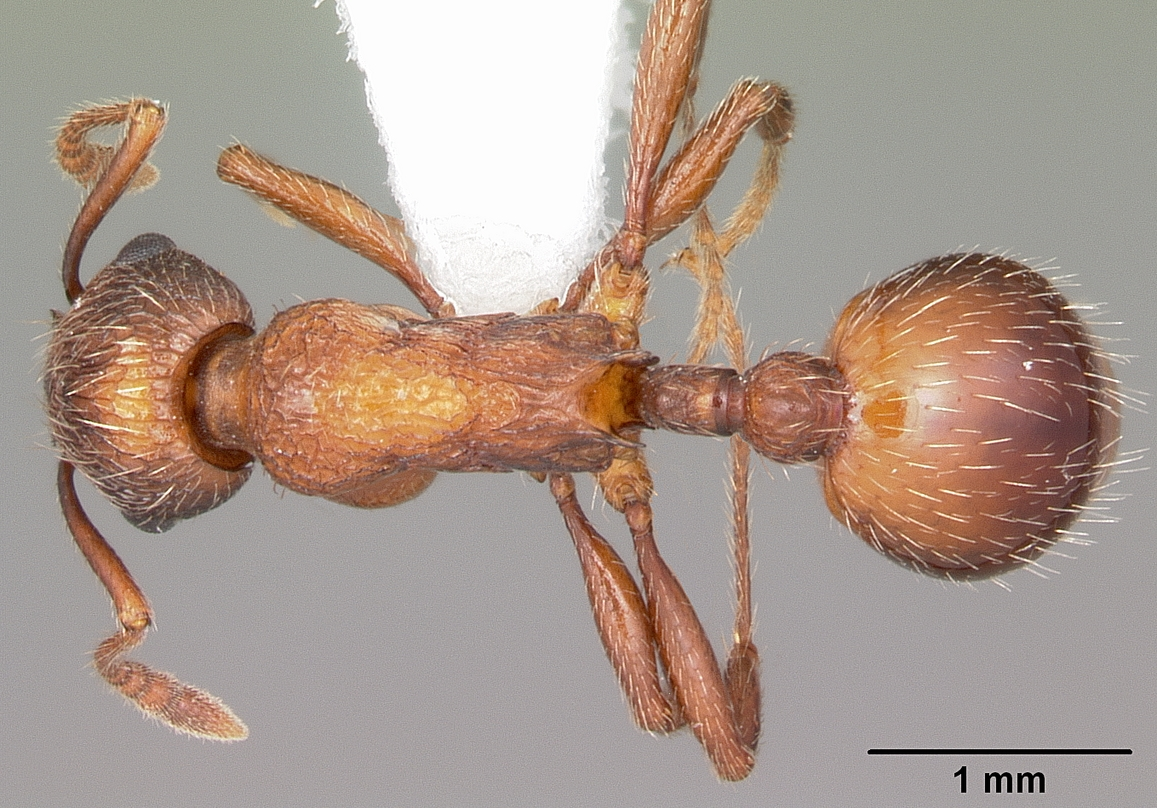

Scientific classification
- Domain: Eukaryota
- Kingdom: Animalia
- Phylum: Arthropoda
- Class: Insecta
- Order: Hymenoptera
- Family: Formicidae
- Subfamily: Myrmicinae
- Tribe: Myrmicini
- Genus: Myrmica
- Species: M. brevispinosa

Binomial name
- Myrmica brevispinosa Wheeler, 1917
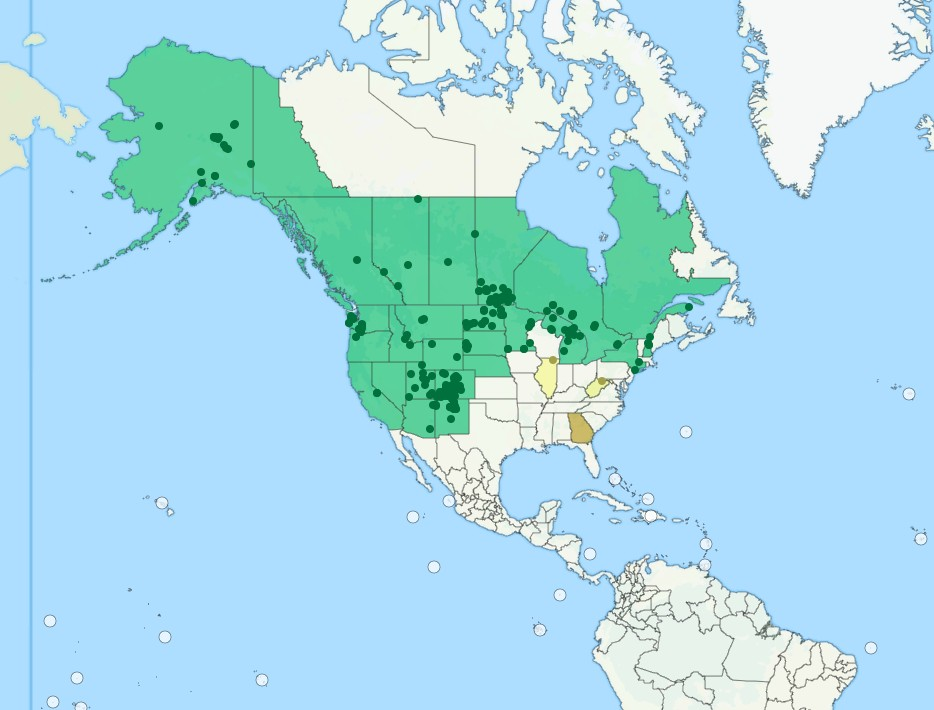

= Myrmica brevispinosa =

Species of ant

Myrmica brevispinosa is a species of ant in the family Formicidae. They can be found in the U.S.A. and Canada.

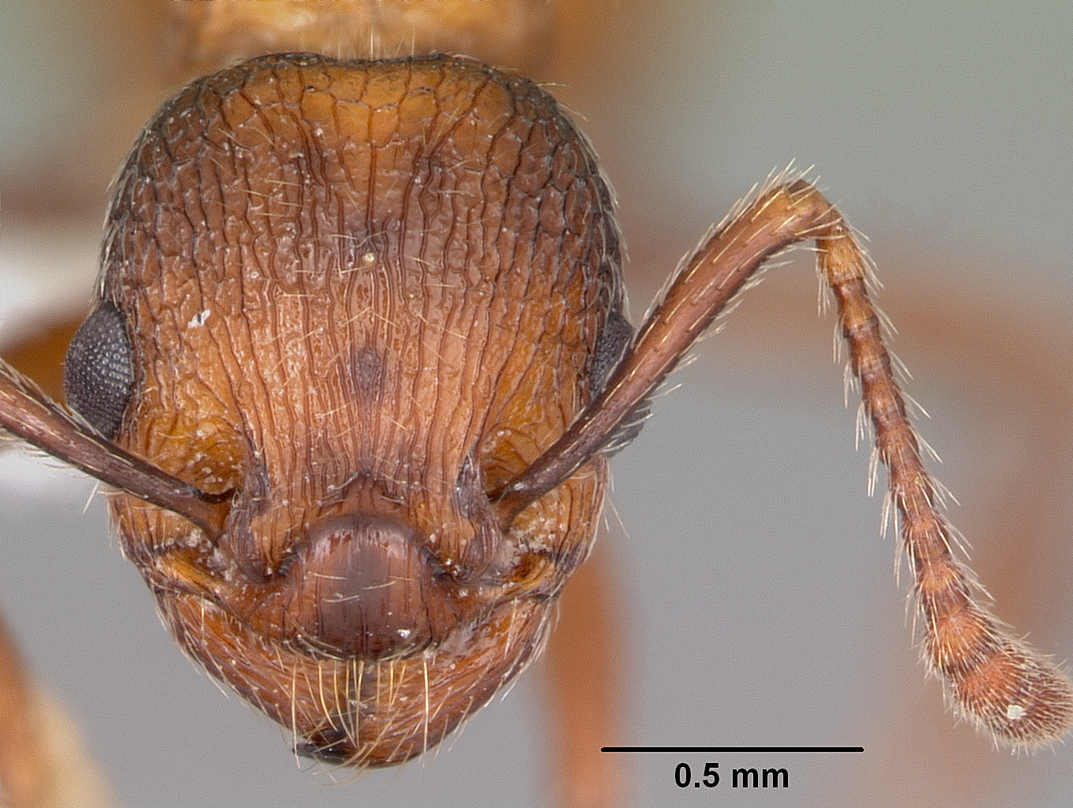

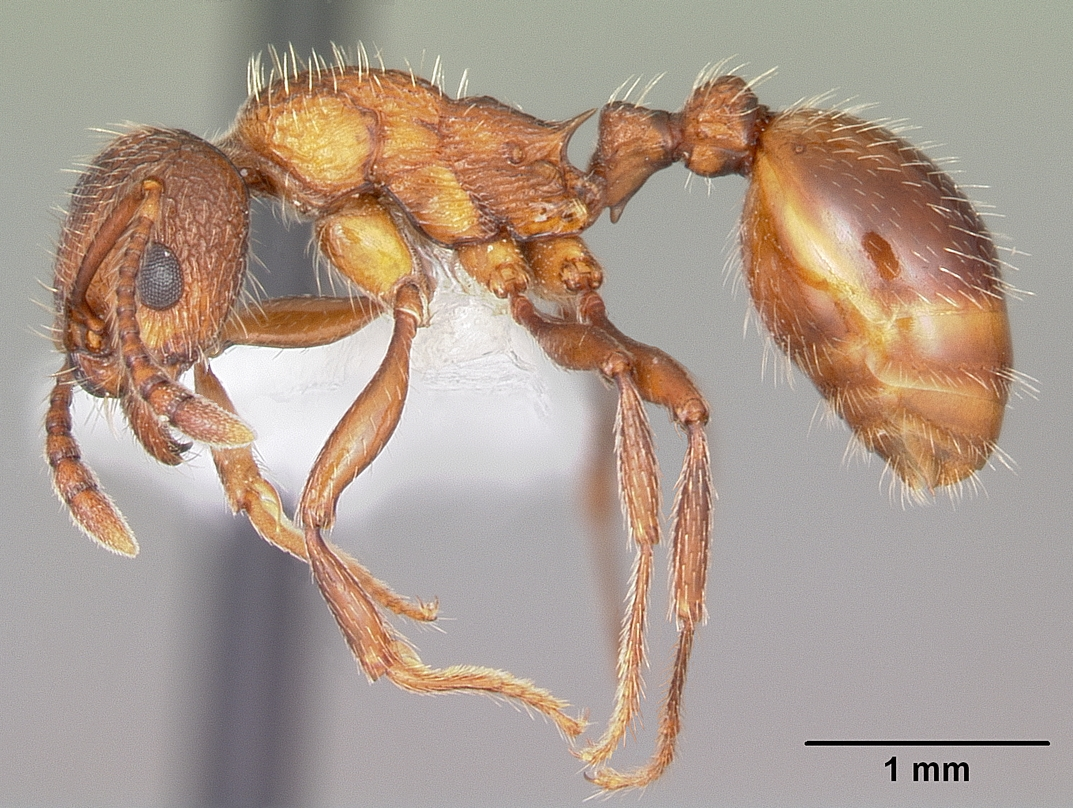
