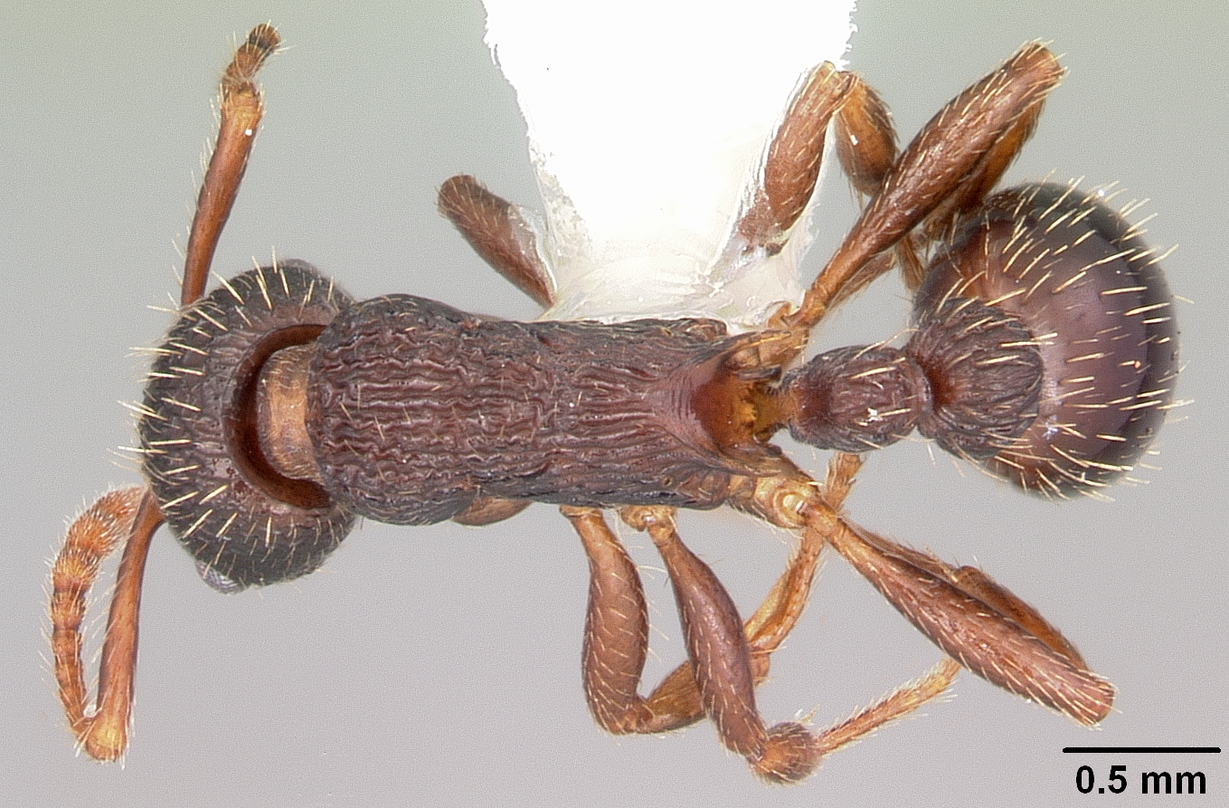

Scientific classification
- Domain: Eukaryota
- Kingdom: Animalia
- Phylum: Arthropoda
- Class: Insecta
- Order: Hymenoptera
- Family: Formicidae
- Subfamily: Myrmicinae
- Genus: Myrmica
- Species: M. spatulata

Binomial name
- Myrmica spatulata Smith, 1930

= Myrmica spatulata =

Species of ant

Myrmica spatulata is a species of ant in the family Formicidae. It is found in the forests of the middle and eastern part of the United States and Ontario in Canada.

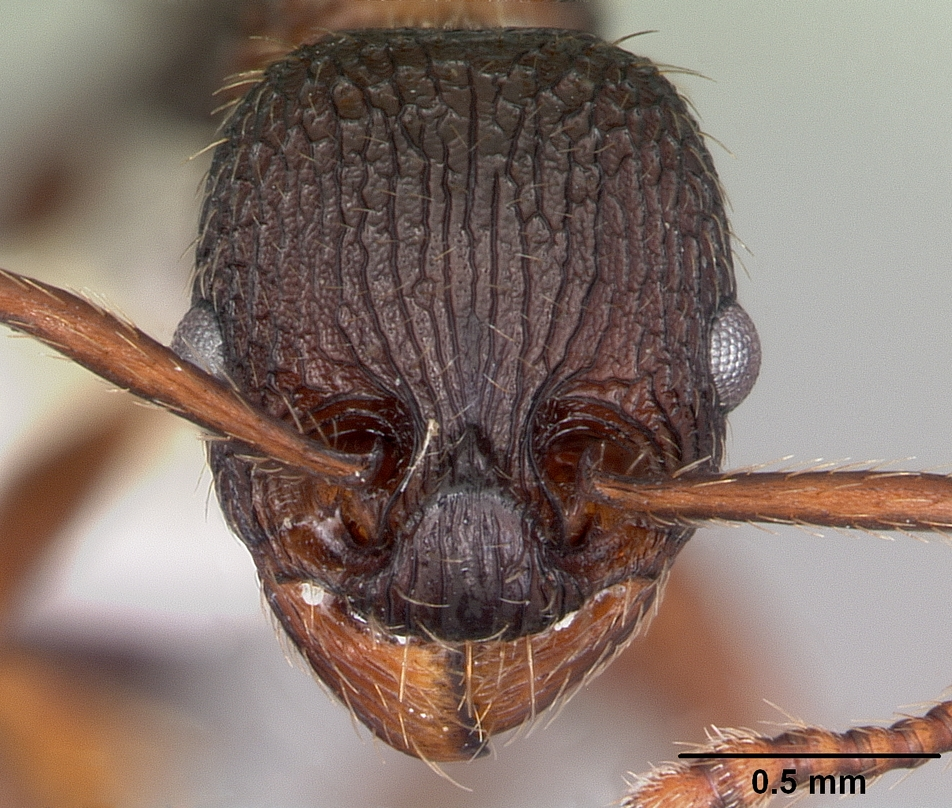

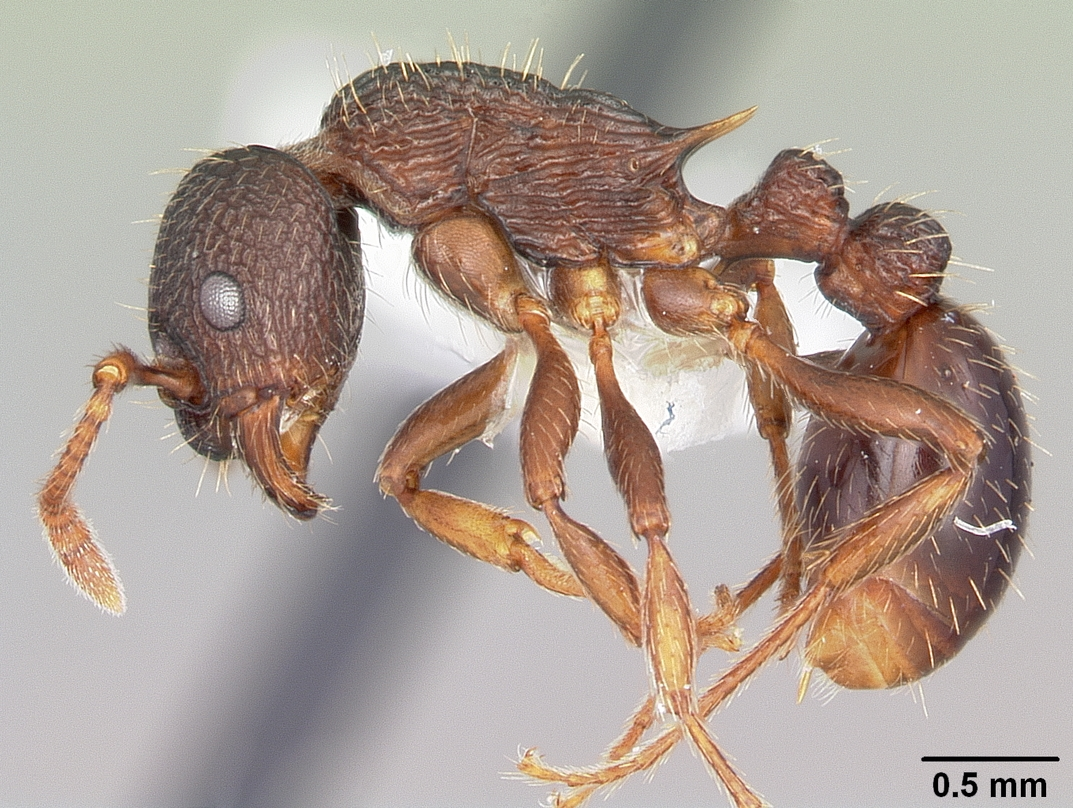
