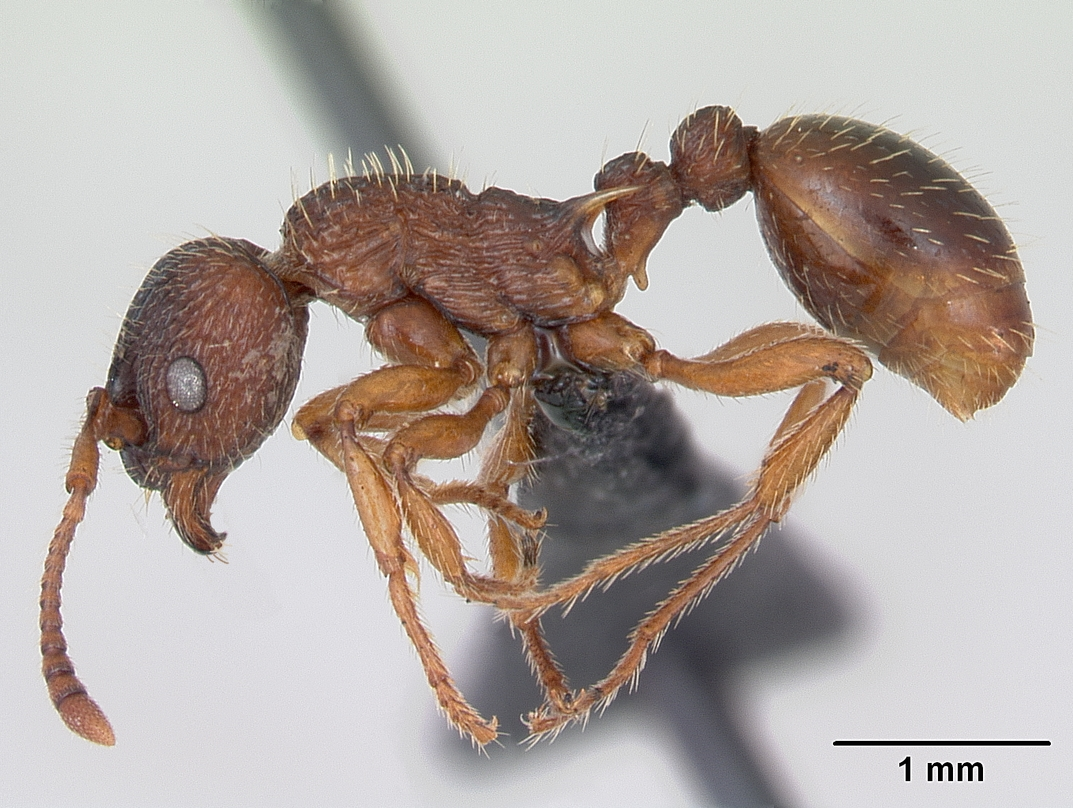
- worker

Scientific classification
- Domain: Eukaryota
- Kingdom: Animalia
- Phylum: Arthropoda
- Class: Insecta
- Order: Hymenoptera
- Family: Formicidae
- Subfamily: Myrmicinae
- Genus: Myrmica
- Species: M. lonae

Binomial name
- Myrmica lonae Finzi, 1926

= Myrmica lonae =

Species of ant

Myrmica lonae is a species of ant distributed across South, Central and North Europe, East Europe, Asia Minor, the Caucasus, West Siberian Plain and Northern Kazakhstan. It inhabits humid meadows both in the plains and in the mountains. It nests in the ground, under stones, or in moss. It forms polygynous colonies with up to 1000 workers or more.
