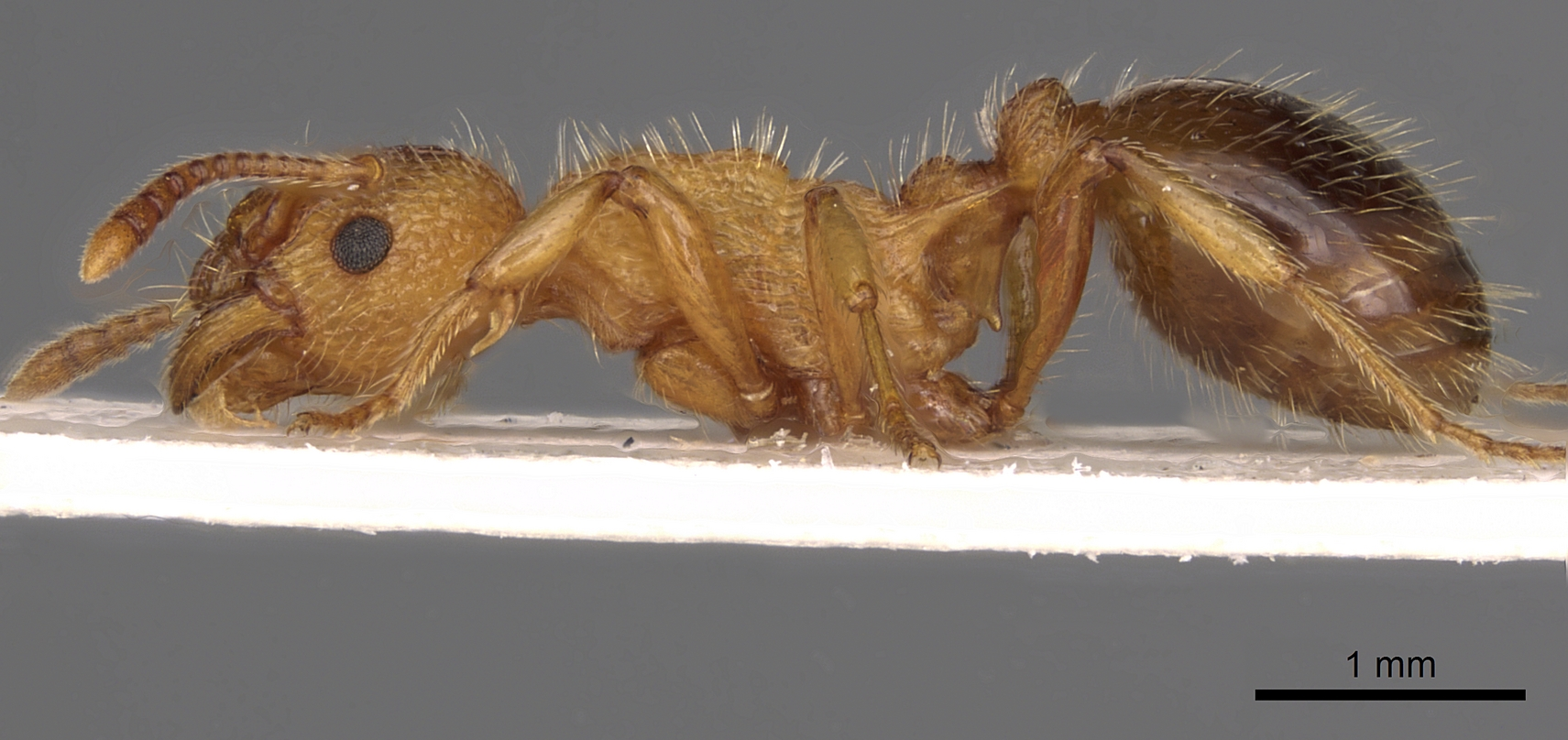

Scientific classification
- Domain: Eukaryota
- Kingdom: Animalia
- Phylum: Arthropoda
- Class: Insecta
- Order: Hymenoptera
- Family: Formicidae
- Subfamily: Myrmicinae
- Genus: Myrmica
- Species: M. bibikoffi

Binomial name
- Myrmica bibikoffi Kutter, 1963
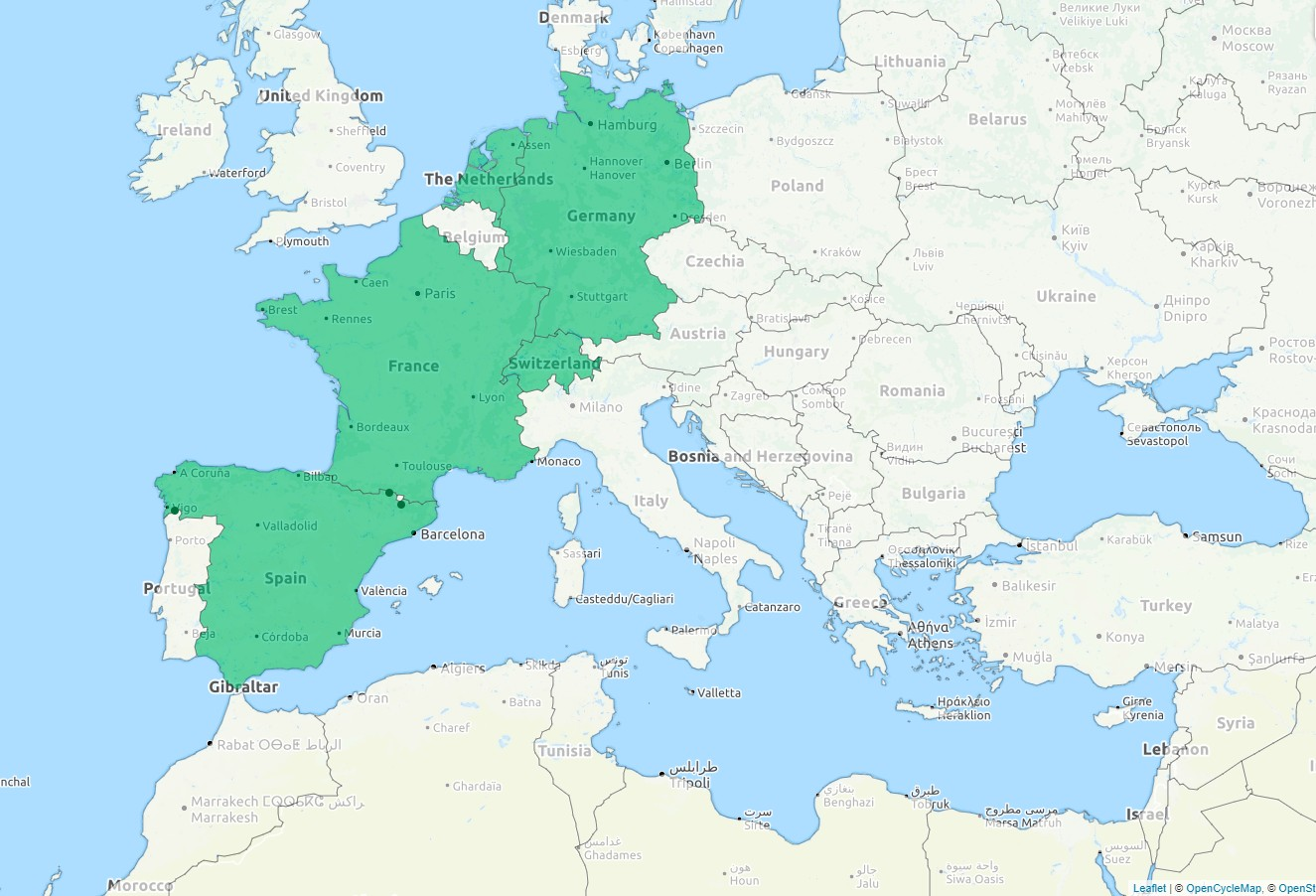

= Myrmica bibikoffi =

Species of ant

Myrmica bibikoffi is a species of ant that can be found in Germany, Switzerland, Spain, France, and The Netherlands.
