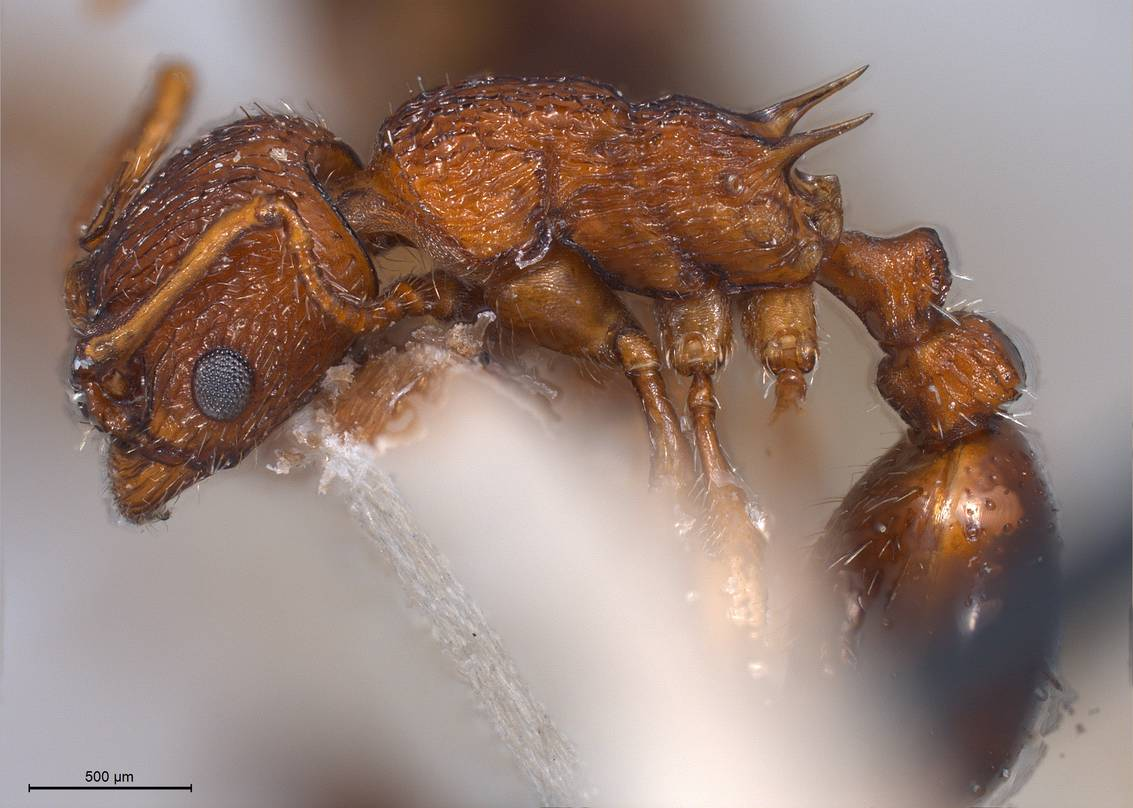
- Myrmica salina worker specimen

Scientific classification
- Kingdom: Animalia
- Phylum: Arthropoda
- Clade: Pancrustacea
- Class: Insecta
- Order: Hymenoptera
- Family: Formicidae
- Subfamily: Myrmicinae
- Genus: Myrmica
- Species: M. salina

Binomial name
- Myrmica salina Ruzsky, 1905

Synonyms
- Myrmica scabrinodis ahngeri Karavaiev, 1926; Myrmica georgica Seifert, 1987; Myrmica tobiasi Radchenko & Elmes, 2004

= Myrmica salina =

Species of ant

Myrmica salina is a species of ant belonging to the genus Myrmica. They have a wide distribution in Europe and Siberia, as well as being abundant in several former republics of the Soviet Union, where their preferred habitats are relatively wet halophyte biotopes. Ruzsky first described the first specimen of the species in 1905.

== Taxonomy ==
M. Ruzsky first described the first M. salina specimen in 1905. The taxonomic history for M. salina is complicated as the type specimens have been presumed to be lost, and the original description of the species was ambiguous. Since being described, the ant has three synonyms, being Myrmica scabrinodis ahngeri, by Karavaiev in 1926, Myrmica georgica by Seifert in 1987, and more recently in 2004, with Myrmica tobiasi by Radchenko and Elmes.

== Description ==
The appearance of M. salina is similar to that of the ants Myrmica scabrinodis, but in comparison to its other relative, Myrmica slovaca, its appearance is much different. The description on the M. salina below is based on the original publications of Ruszky, as well as comments mentioned in Radchenko and Elmes' (2010) publication:

The descriptions of M. slaina ants were based on worker, queen and males collected from various places in Siberia and Kazakhstan. Worker ants had an average length of 4.7–5 mm in length, with brownish-red colors, along with dark brown or blackish-brown head dorsum and first gastral segment. The antennae, mandibles, leg, apex and gaster are of a lighter color. Queens and males are of a same size, usually around 5–6 mm in length. The queen has similar features to the workers, with the exception of its color appearance much darker than its worker counterparts, as well as its antennal scape thickening in the middle.

== Distribution ==
Myrmica salina has been observed only in wet and damp habitats, usually seen foraging or even nesting in halophyte and biotope environments, in which these habitats were studied in West Siberia and Kazakhstan. Their type habitat is salt marsh, where they nest in soil and under rocks, in grass turf, mostly lasine soil. The distribution of M. salina is mainly in Central Europe and East Europe, where they are found in the European countries of Austria, Czech Republic, Slovenia, Croatia, Romania and Russia (also found in the Asian part of Russia), while in Asia (notably countries of the former Soviet Union) they are found in Georgia, Kyrgyzstan and Kazakhstan.

== Etymology ==
From medieval Latin, salina is translated to "salt pan", or salted place derived from the Latin word salis, which means salt. The name describes the ants type habitat "salted marsh".
