= Myrmica tschekanovskii =

Scientific classification
- Domain: Eukaryota
- Kingdom: Animalia
- Phylum: Arthropoda
- Class: Insecta
- Order: Hymenoptera
- Family: Formicidae
- Subfamily: Myrmicinae
- Genus: Myrmica
- Species: M. tschekanovskii

Binomial name
- Myrmica tschekanovskii Radchenko, 1994

Species of ant

Myrmica tschekanovskii is a species of ant, one of around 200 known species of the genus Myrmica which is widespread throughout the temperate regions of the Holarctic. It was first described in 1994 by Dr Alexander Radchenko, of the Schmalhausen Institute of Zoology in Ukraine.
