= Myrmica kotokui =

Scientific classification
- Domain: Eukaryota
- Kingdom: Animalia
- Phylum: Arthropoda
- Class: Insecta
- Order: Hymenoptera
- Family: Formicidae
- Subfamily: Myrmicinae
- Genus: Myrmica
- Species: M. kotokui

Binomial name
- Myrmica kotokui Collingwood, 1976

Species of ant

Myrmica kotokui (Japanese: shiwa-kushike-ari) is a species of ant of the genus Myrmica.

This species closely resembles the European Myrmica ruginodis and is perhaps not a separate distinctive species. Onoyama (1989) suggested that it might best be treated as a subspecies of M. ruginodis.
