= Myrmica faniensis =

Conservation status
- Vulnerable (IUCN 2.3)

Scientific classification
- Kingdom: Animalia
- Phylum: Arthropoda
- Class: Insecta
- Order: Hymenoptera
- Family: Formicidae
- Subfamily: Myrmicinae
- Genus: Myrmica
- Species: M. faniensis

Binomial name
- Myrmica faniensis Boven, 1970

Species of ant

Myrmica faniensis is a species of ant in family Formicidae. It is endemic to Belgium. However, it should be considered a junior synonym of Myrmica karavajevi (Arnoldi, 1930).
