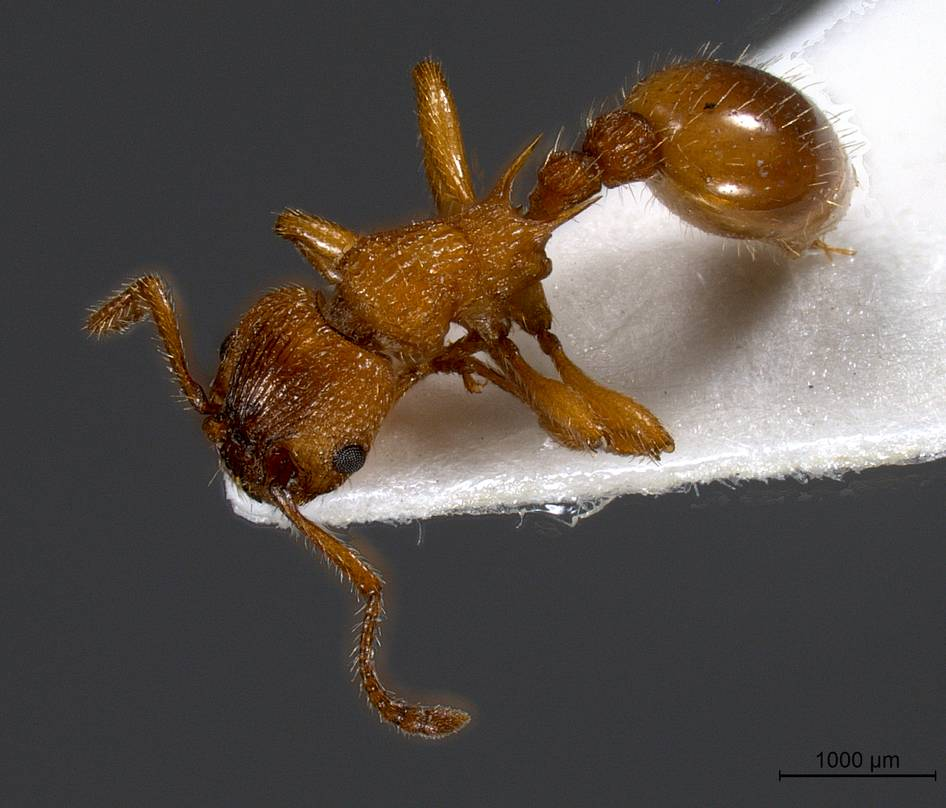

Scientific classification
- Domain: Eukaryota
- Kingdom: Animalia
- Phylum: Arthropoda
- Class: Insecta
- Order: Hymenoptera
- Family: Formicidae
- Subfamily: Myrmicinae
- Genus: Myrmica
- Species: M. aloba

Binomial name
- Myrmica aloba Forel, 1909
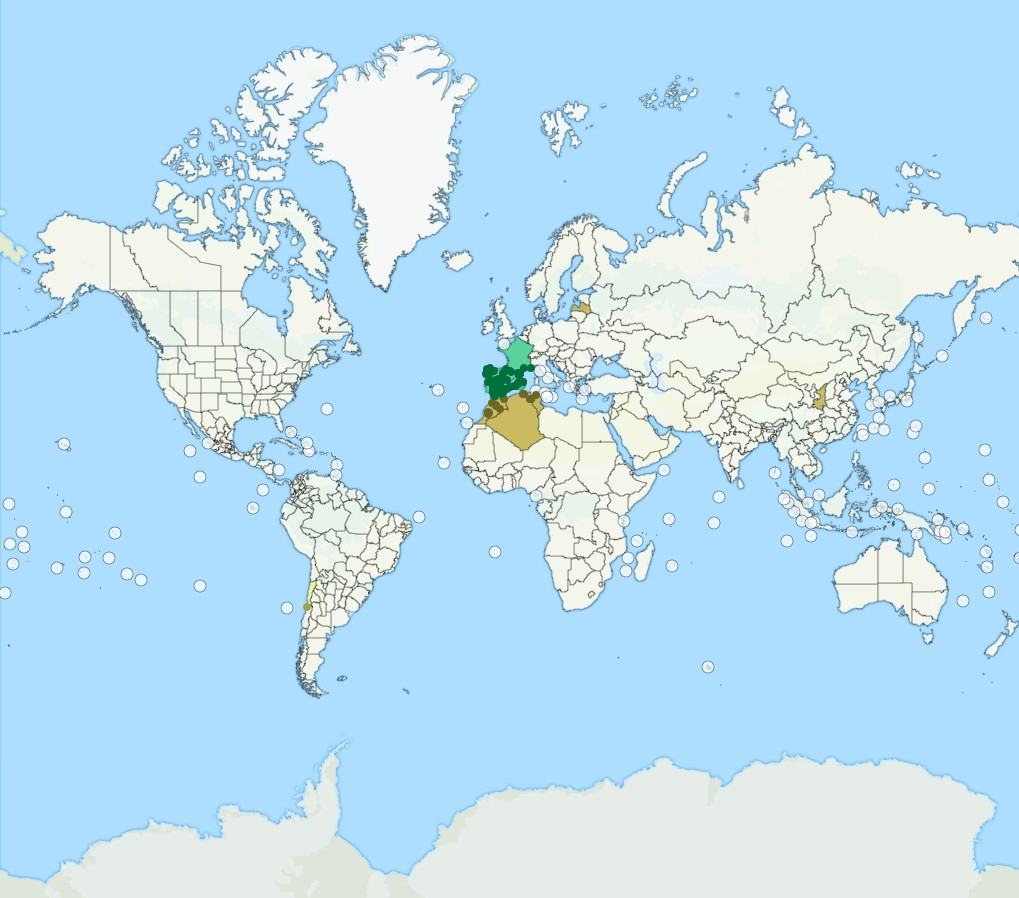

= Myrmica aloba =

Species of ant

Myrmica aloba is a species of ant that can be found in France, Portugal, and Spain.
