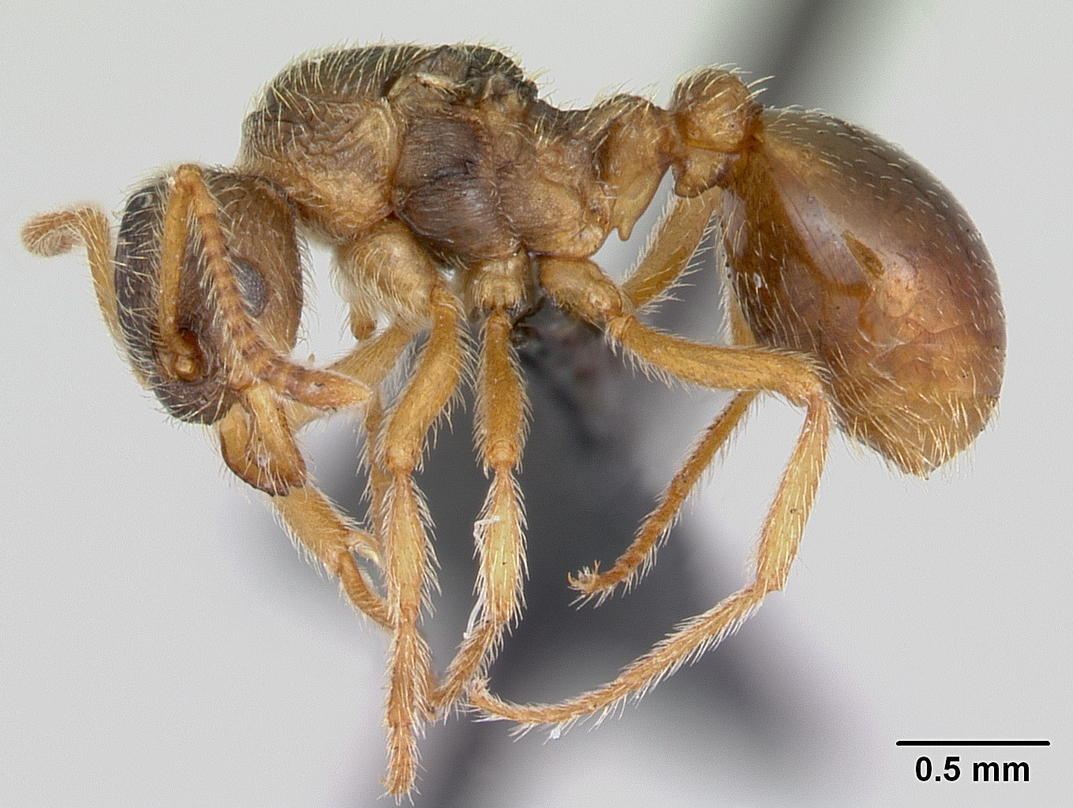

Scientific classification
- Domain: Eukaryota
- Kingdom: Animalia
- Phylum: Arthropoda
- Class: Insecta
- Order: Hymenoptera
- Family: Formicidae
- Subfamily: Myrmicinae
- Genus: Myrmica
- Species: M. karavajevi

Binomial name
- Myrmica karavajevi (Arnoldi, 1930)

= Myrmica karavajevi =

Species of ant

Myrmica karavajevi is a workerless, socially parasitic ant species: it is widely distributed across Europe (Ukraine, European Russia, Belarus, Moldova, Hungary, Romania, Estonia, Finland, Sweden, Norway, Poland, the Czech Republic, Germany, Belgium, Austria, Switzerland, England, Italy, France and Spain). It lives in nests of other species (Myrmica scabrinodis and close relatives) that inhabit warm and humid habitats.
