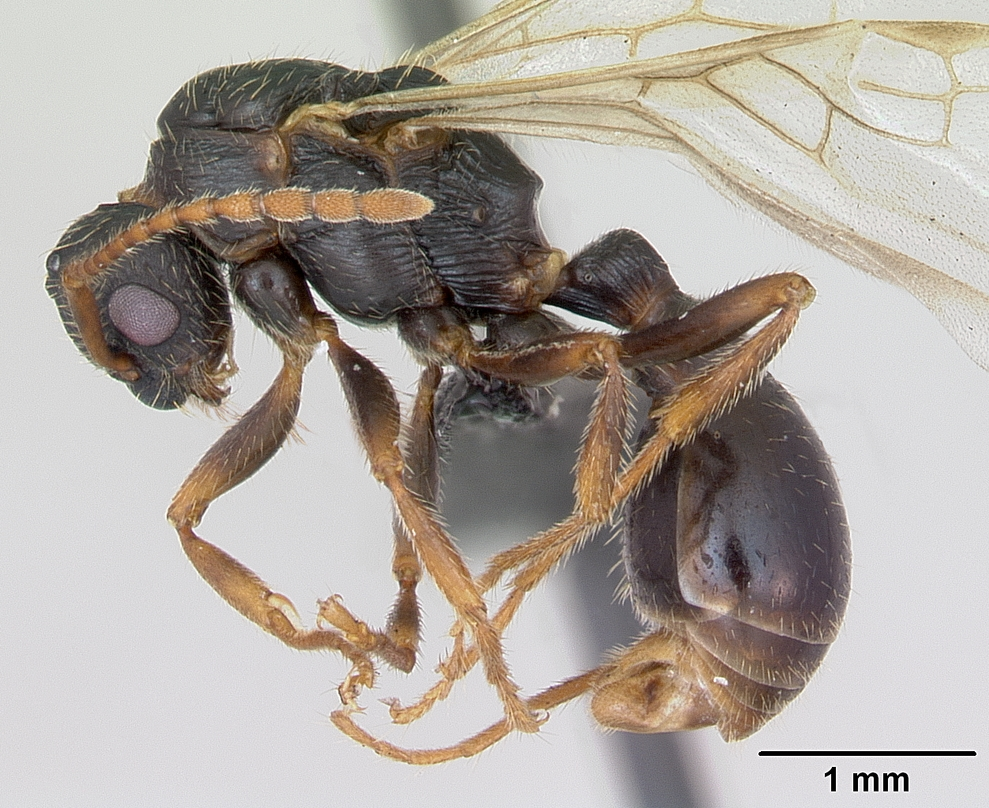

Scientific classification
- Domain: Eukaryota
- Kingdom: Animalia
- Phylum: Arthropoda
- Class: Insecta
- Order: Hymenoptera
- Family: Formicidae
- Subfamily: Myrmicinae
- Genus: Myrmica
- Species: M. sulcinodis

Binomial name
- Myrmica sulcinodis Nylander, 1846

= Myrmica sulcinodis =

Species of insect

Myrmica sulcinodis is a species of ant belonging to the family Formicidae.

It is native to Europe and Northern America.
