= Myrmica hellenica =

Scientific classification
- Domain: Eukaryota
- Kingdom: Animalia
- Phylum: Arthropoda
- Class: Insecta
- Order: Hymenoptera
- Family: Formicidae
- Subfamily: Myrmicinae
- Genus: Myrmica
- Species: M. hellenica

Binomial name
- Myrmica hellenica Finzi, 1926

Species of insect

Myrmica hellenica is a species of ant belonging to the family Formicidae.

It is native to Europe, Eastern Asia and Northern America.
