= Myrmica lemasnei =

Scientific classification
- Domain: Eukaryota
- Kingdom: Animalia
- Phylum: Arthropoda
- Class: Insecta
- Order: Hymenoptera
- Family: Formicidae
- Subfamily: Myrmicinae
- Genus: Myrmica
- Species: M. lemasnei

Binomial name
- Myrmica lemasnei Bernard, 1967

Species of ant

Myrmica lemasnei is a species of ant that can be found in France and Spain.
