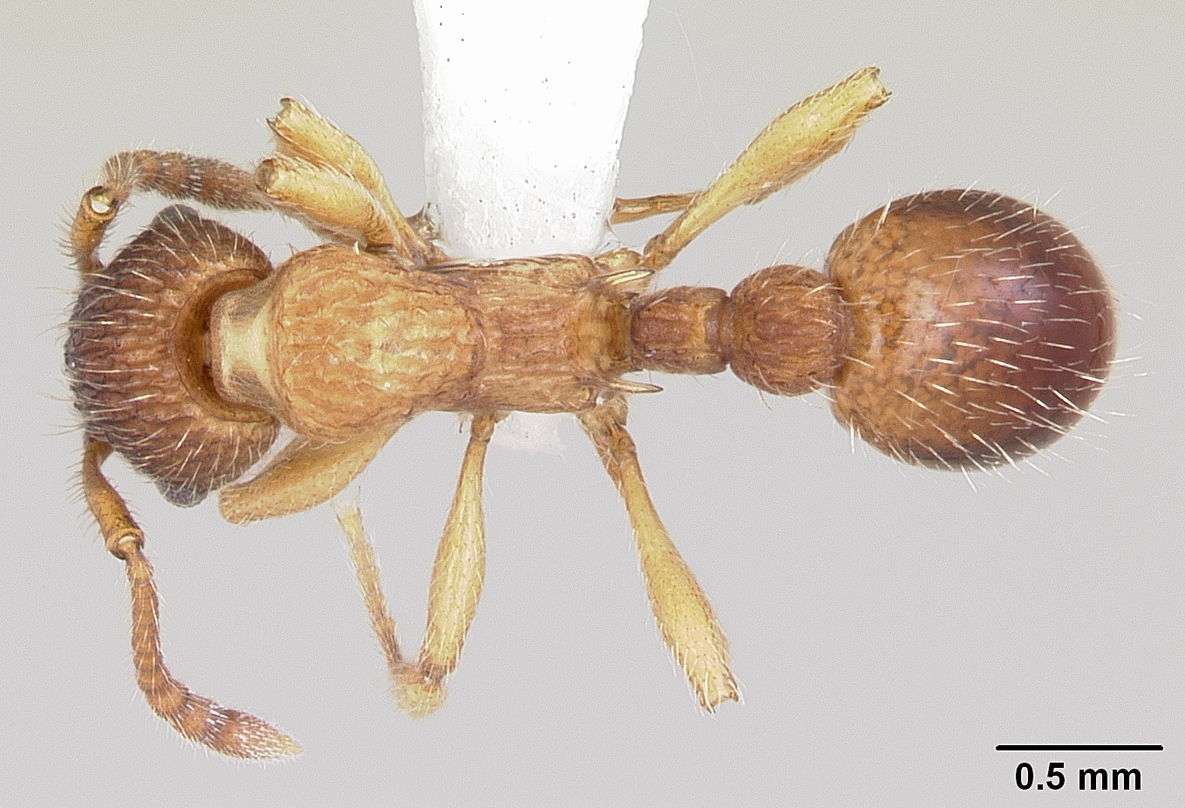

Scientific classification
- Domain: Eukaryota
- Kingdom: Animalia
- Phylum: Arthropoda
- Class: Insecta
- Order: Hymenoptera
- Family: Formicidae
- Subfamily: Myrmicinae
- Tribe: Myrmicini
- Genus: Myrmica
- Species: M. pinetorum

Binomial name
- Myrmica pinetorum Wheeler, 1905

= Myrmica pinetorum =

Species of ant

Myrmica pinetorum is a species of ant in the family Formicidae.

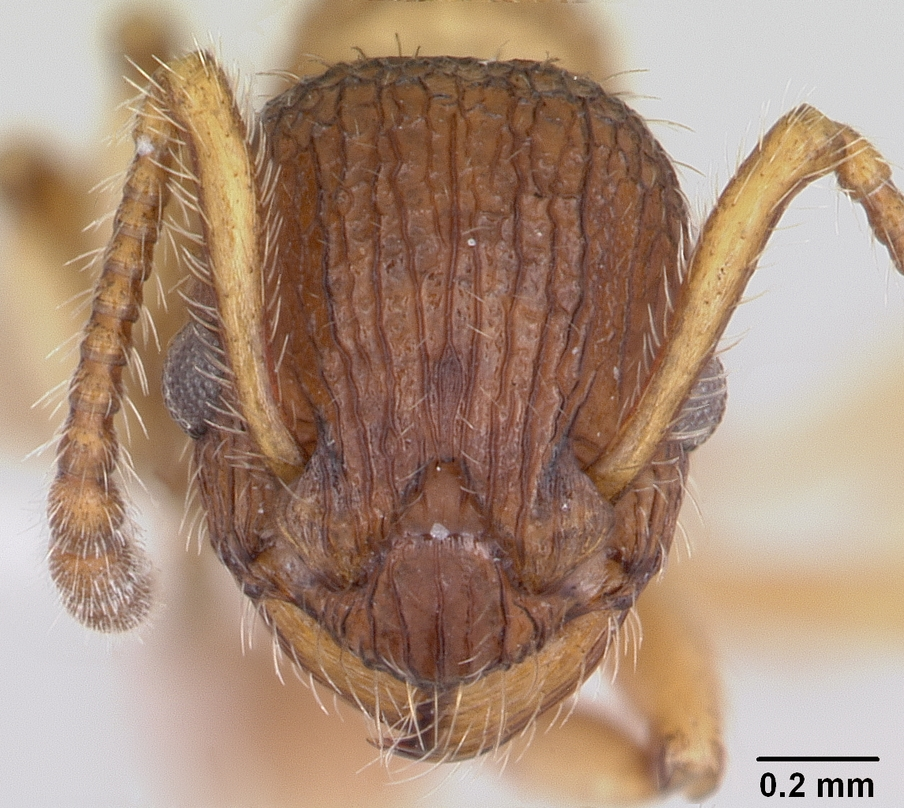

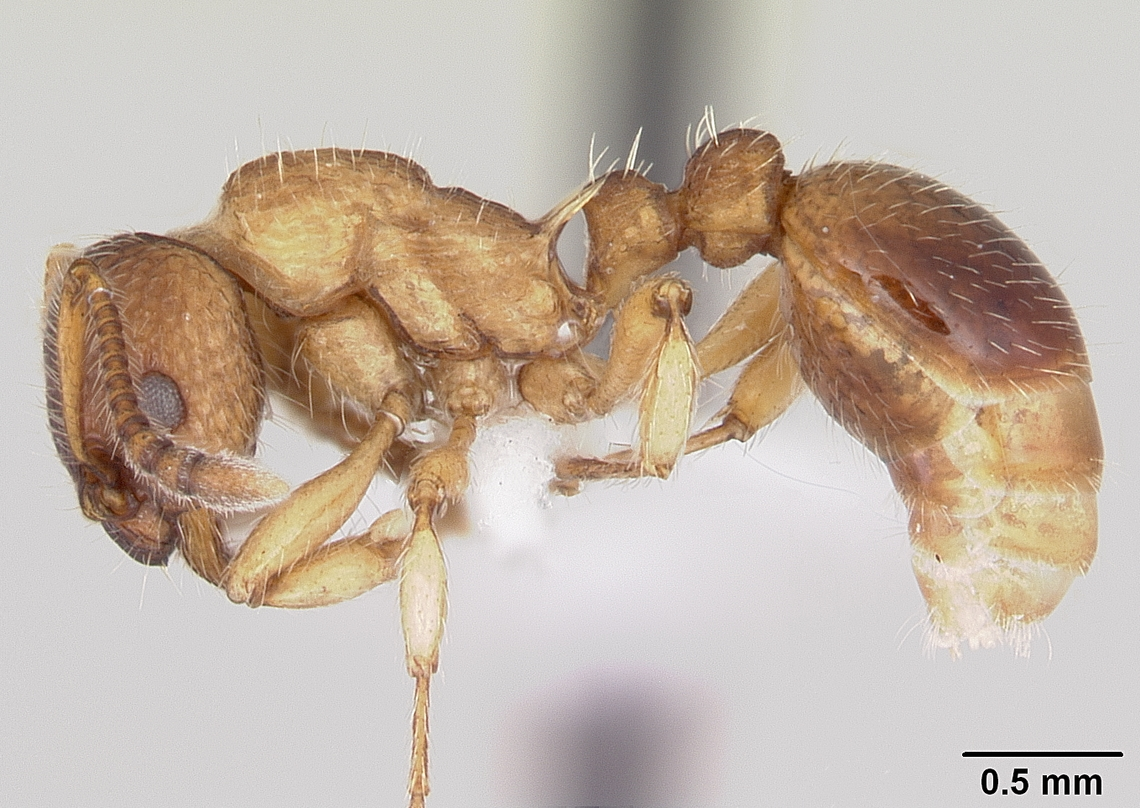
