= Myrmica afghanica =

Scientific classification
- Domain: Eukaryota
- Kingdom: Animalia
- Phylum: Arthropoda
- Class: Insecta
- Order: Hymenoptera
- Family: Formicidae
- Subfamily: Myrmicinae
- Genus: Myrmica
- Species: M. afghanica

Binomial name
- Myrmica afghanica Radchenko & Elmes, 2003
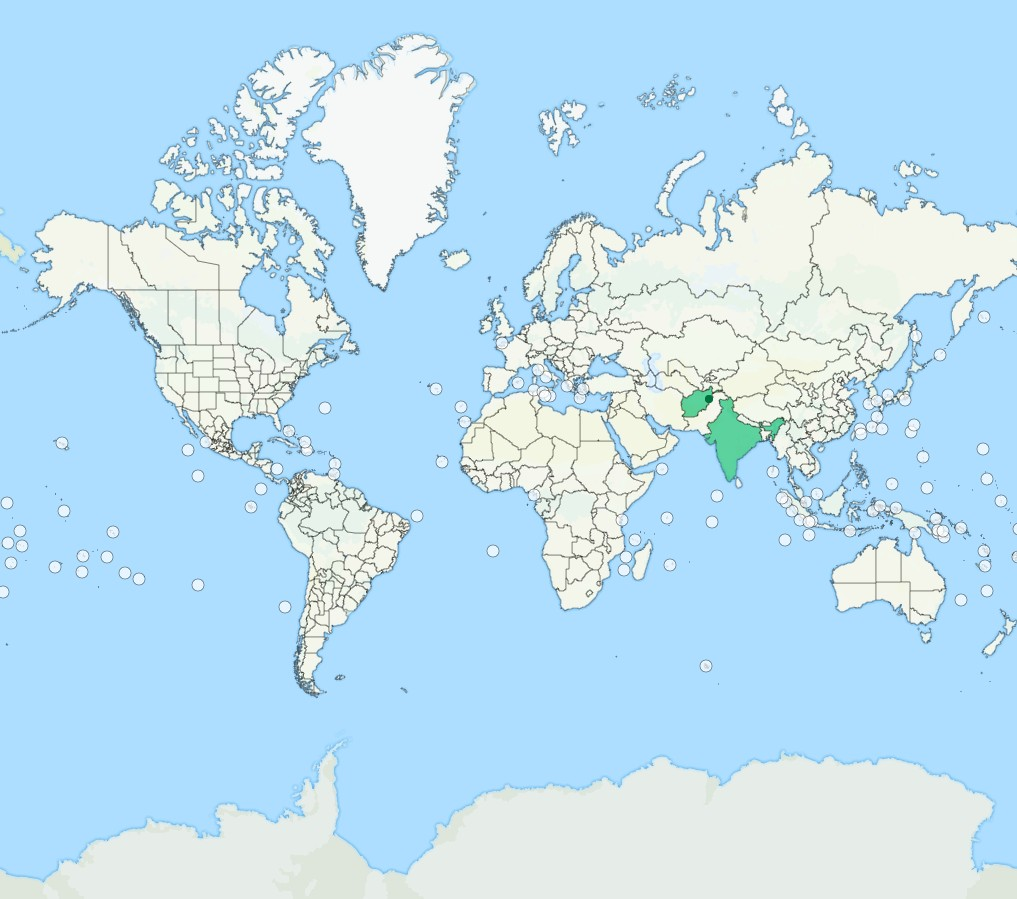

Species of Myrmica ant found in Afghanistan

Myrmica afghanica is a species of ant from Afghanistan and India. It is commonly found in the western portion of Afghanistan and is part of the genus Myrmica.
