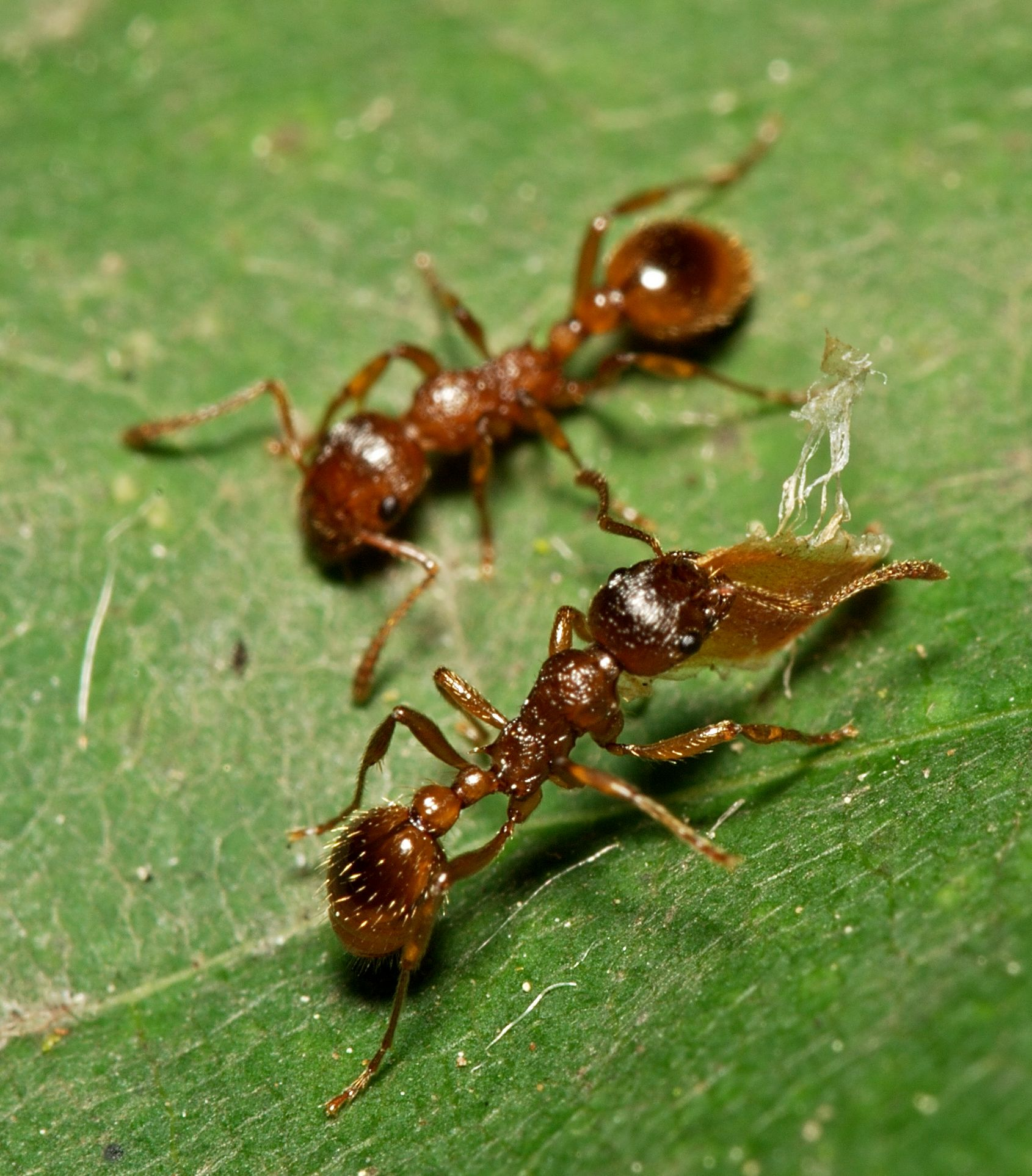
- Myrmica species

Scientific classification
- Kingdom: Animalia
- Phylum: Arthropoda
- Clade: Pancrustacea
- Class: Insecta
- Order: Hymenoptera
- Family: Formicidae
- Subfamily: Myrmicinae
- Tribe: Myrmicini
- Genus: Myrmica; Latreille, 1804

Type species
- Formica rubra Linnaeus, 1758

Diversity
- c. 200 species

Synonyms
- Dodecamyrmica Arnol'di, 1968; Nothomyrmica Wheeler, W.M., 1915; Paramyrmica Cole, 1957; Sifolinia Emery, 1907; Sommimyrma Menozzi, 1925; Symbiomyrma Arnol'di, 1930

= Myrmica =

Genus of ants

Myrmica is a genus of ants within the subfamily Myrmicinae. It is widespread throughout the temperate regions of the Holarctic and high mountains in Southeast Asia.

The genus consists of around 200 known species and additional subspecies, although this figure is likely to rise as soon as the Chinese and Nearctic fauna lists are revised.

== Inquilines ==
The genus contains a number of inquiline species (commensal symbionts), other Myrmica species that manage to invade the nest of their host. Subsequently, they use hormones to manipulate the host colony in such a way that eggs of the host queen develop into workers, and parasite brood into sexuals. Hence, the parasite is not able to sustain a colony of its own, but uses host resources instead.

Similarly, larvae of the butterfly genus Maculinea (a junior synonym of Phengaris, family Lycaenidae) and of the southern armyworm, live inside Myrmica nests where they are either directly fed by ants or prey upon ant brood. This parasitism is employed primarily by specific species such as Phengaris arion forming predatory relationships.

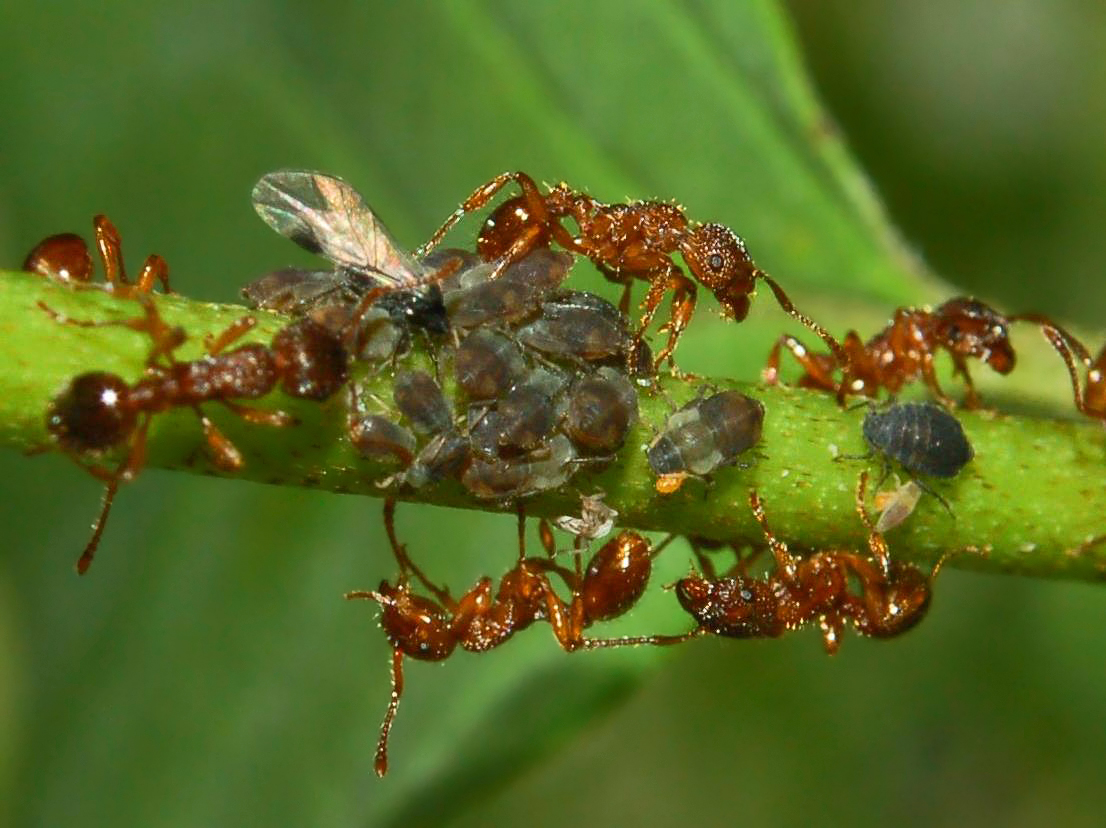
Myrmica species cultivating aphids

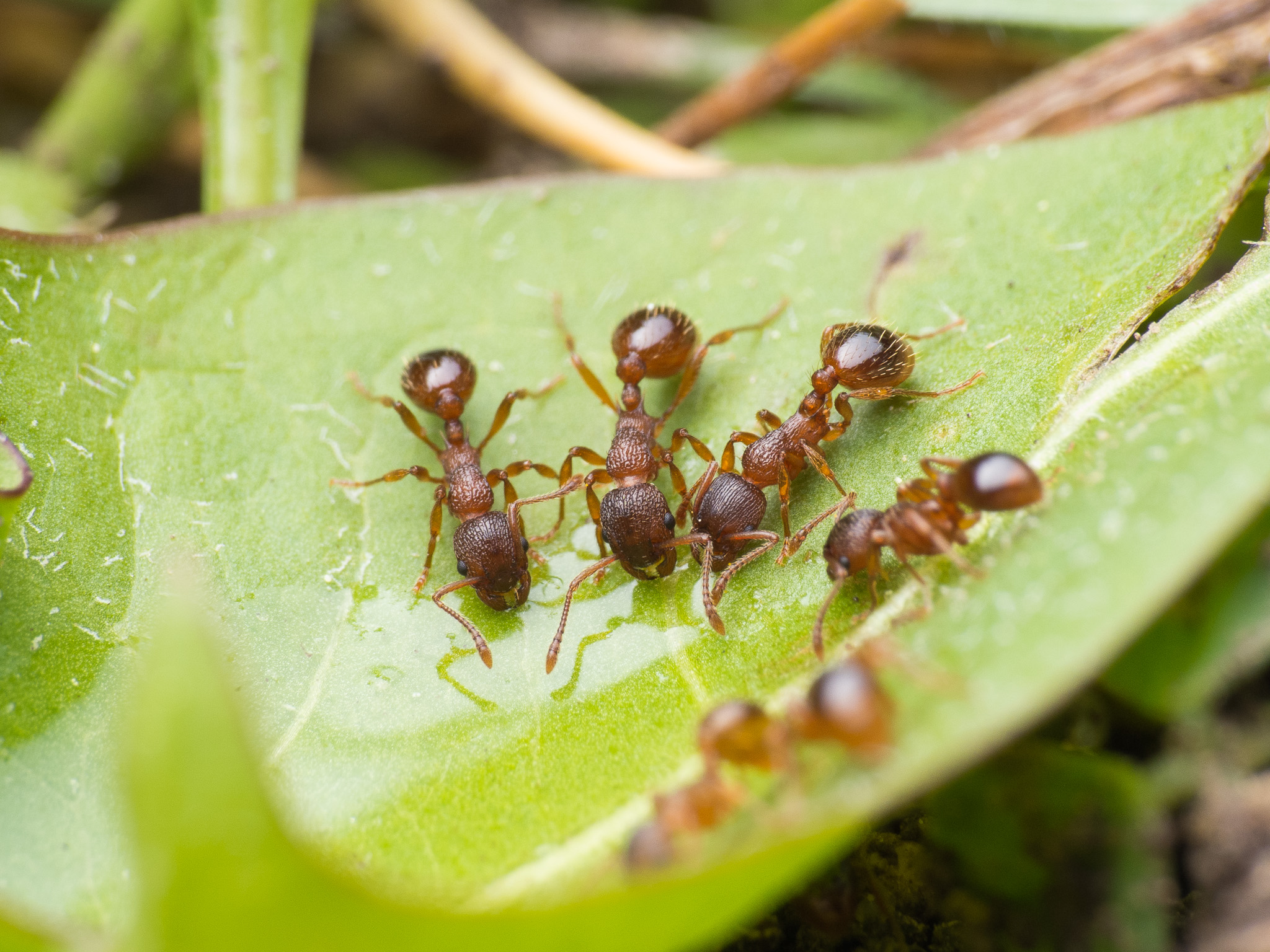
Myrmica species workers drinking sugared water

== Species ==
- M. ademonia Bolton
- M. afghanica Radchenko and Elmes
- M. aimonissabaudiae Menozzi
- M. alaskensis Wheeler
- M. aldrichi
- M. aloba Forel
- M. americana Weber
- M. anatolica Elmes Radchenko and Aktac
- M. angulata Radchenko, A.G., Zhou. S., and Elmes, G.W.
- M. angulinodis Ruzsky
- M. arisana Wheeler
- M. arnoldii Dlussky
- M. atomaria Gerstaecker
- M. basalis Smith
- M. bergi Ruzsky
- M. bessarabica Nasonov
- M. bidens Förster
- M. bibikoffi Kutter
- M. boltoni Radchenko and Elmes
- M. brancuccii Radchenko and Elmes
- M. breviceps Smith, F.
- M. brevinodis Emery
- M. brevispinosa Wheeler
- M. cachmiriensis Forel
- M. cadusa Kim Park and Kim
- M. cagnianti Espadaler
- M. cariniceps Guérin-Méneville
- M. caucasicola Arnol’di,
- M. chinensis Viehmeyer
- M. colax Cole
- M. collingwoodi Radchenko and Elmes
- M. commarginata Ruzsky
- M. contigue Smith
- M. cursor Smith, F.
- M. curvithorax Bondroit
- M. diluta Nylander
- M. dimidiata Say
- M. discontinua Weber
- M. displicentia Bolton
- M. divergens Karavaiev
- M. domestica Shuckard
- M. draco Radchenko, G.G., Zhou.S., Elmes, G.W.
- M. dshungarica Ruzsky
- M. eidmanni Menozzi
- M. elmesi Bharti and Sharma
- M. emeryana Cole
- M. ereptrix Bolton
- M. excelsa Kupyanskaya
- M. exigua Buckley
- M. faniensis Boven, 1970
- M. ferganensis Finzi
- M. forcipata Karavaiev
- M. foreliana Radchenko and Elmes
- M. formosae Wheeler, W.M.
- M. fortior Forel
- M. fracticornis Forel
- M. fragilis Smith
- M. fuscula Nylander
- M. galbula Losana
- M. gallienii Bondroit
- M. gigantea Collingwood
- M. glaber Smith
- M. glacialis Emery
- M. glyciphila Smith
- M. gracillima Smith
- M. hamulata Weber
- M. hecate Weber
- M. hellenica Finzi
- M. helleri Viehmeyer
- M. hirsuta Elmes
- M. hyungokae Elmes, G.W., Radchenkoo, A.G., and Kim, B.
- M. incompleta Provancher
- M. incurvata Collingwood
- M. indica Weber
- M. inezae Forel
- M. jennyae Elmes, Radchenko, and Aktac
- M. jessensis Forel
- M. juglandeti Arnol'di
- M. kabylica Cagniant
- M. kamtschatica Kupyanskaya
- M. karavajevi Arnol’di
- M. kasczenkoi Ruzsky
- M. kirghisorum Arnol’di
- M. kollari Mayr
- M. koreana Elmes, G.W., Radchenkoo, A.G., and Kim, B., 2001
- M. kotokui Forel
- M. kozlovi Ruzsky
- M. kryzhanovskii Arnol'di
- M. kurokii Forel
- M. lacustris Ruzsky
- M. laevigata Smith
- M. laevinodis Nylander, 1846
- M. laevissima Smith
- M. lampra Francoeur
- M. latifrons Starcke
- M. laurae Emery
- M. lemasnei Bernard
- M. lobicornis Nylander
- M. lobifrons Pergande
- M. lonae Finzi
- M. longiscapus Curtis
- M. luctuosa Smith, F.
- M. luteola Kupyanskaya
- M. magniceps
- M. margaritae Emery
- M. martensi Radchenko and Elmes
- M. mellea Smith
- M. mexicana Wheeler, W.M.
- M. microrubra Seifert
- M. minkii Förster
- M. minuta Ruzsky
- M. mirabile Elmes & Radchenko
- M. mirabilis Elmes & Radchenko
- M. modesta Smith
- M. molesta
- M. molifaciens
- M. monticola Creighton
- M. myrmicoxena Forel
- M. nearctica Weber
- M. nitida Radchenko
- M. ominosa Gerstaecker
- M. ordinaria Radchenko
- M. orthostyla Arnol’di
- M. pachei Forel
- M. parallela Smith
- M. pellucida Smith
- M. pelops Seifert
- M. petita Radchenko
- M. pinetorum Wheeler
- M. pisarskii Radchenko
- M. punctiventris Roger
- M. quebecensis Francoeur
- M. radchenkoi Bharti and Sharma
- M. ravasinii Finzi
- M. reticulata Smith
- M. rhytida Radchenko
- M. rigatoi Radchenko and Elmes
- M. ritae Emery
- M. rubra Linnaeus
- M. ruginodis Nylander
- M. rugiventris Smith
- M. rugosa Mayr
- M. rugulosa Nylander
- M. rugulososcabrinodis Karawajew
- M. rupestris Forel
- M. sabuleti Meinert
- M. salina Ruzsky
- M. samnitica Mei
- M. saposhnikovi Ruzsky
- M. scabrinodis Nylander
- M. schencki Viereck
- M. seminigra Cresson
- M. serica Wheeler, W.M
- M. silvestrii Wheeler, W.M
- M. sinensis Radchenko, A.G., Zhou, S., and Elmes, G.W.
- M. sinica Wu and Wang
- M. smythiesii Forel
- M. spatulata Smith
- M. specioides Bondroit
- M. stangeana Ruzsky
- M. striatula Nylander
- M. striolagaster Cole
- M. sulcinodis Nylander
- M. suspiciosa Smith
- M. symbiotica Menozzi
- M. taediosa Bolton
- M. tahoensis Wheeler
- M. taibaiensis Wei, Zhou and Liu, 2001
- M. tamarae ElmesRadchenko and Aktac
- M. tenuispina Ruzsky
- M. tibetana Mayr
- M. titanica Radchenko
- M. transsibirica Radchenko
- M. trinodis Losana
- M. tschekanovskii Radchenko
- M. tulinae Elmes, Radchenko, and Aktac
- M. turcica Santschi
- M. unifasciata Bostock
- M. urbanii Radchenko
- M. vandeli Bondroit
- M. vastator Smith
- M. vexator Smith
- M. villosa Radchenko and Elmes
- M. vittata Radchenko and Elmes
- M. wardi Radchenko
- M. wesmaeli Bondroit
- M. wheeleri Weber
- M. whymperi Forel
- M. williamsi Radchenko
- M. winterae (Kutter, 1973)
- M. wittmeri Radchenko
- M. yamanei Radchenko
- M. yoshiokai Weber
- M. zojae Radchenko

== See also ==
- Non-human agriculture

== Bibliography ==
- Latreille, P.A. 1804: Tableau méthodique des insectes. Classe huitième. Insectes, Insecta. Nouveau Dictionnaire d'Histoire Naturelle, 24: 129–200.
- Lepeletier de Saint-Fargeau. 1835: Histoire naturelle des insectes. Hyménoptères. I. Librairie Encyclopédique de Roret, Paris. 574 pp.
- Roger. 1863: Verzeichniss der Formiciden-Gattungen und Arten. Berliner Entomologische Zeitschrift, 7(suppl.): 1–65.
- Dours. 1873: Catalogue synonymique des Hyménoptères de France. Memoires de la Société Linneenne du Nord de la France, 3: 1–230.
- Radchenko & Elmes. 1998: Taxonomic revision of the ritae species-group of the genus Myrmica (Hymenoptera, Formicidae). Vestnik Zoologii, 32.
- Radchenko & Elmes. 2001: A taxonomic revision of the ant genus Myrmica Latreille, 1804 from the Himalaya (Hymenoptera, Formicidae). Entomologica Basiliensia, 23: 237–276.
- Wei, Zhou & He. 2001: A taxonomic study of the genus Myrmica Latreille from China (Hymenoptera: Formicidae). Acta Zootaxonomica Sinica, 26(4): 560–564.
- Radchenko A.G. & G.W. Elmes. 2003: A taxonomic revision of the socially parasitic Myrmica ants (Hymenoptera: Formicidae) of the Palaearctic region. Annales Zoologici, 53(2): 217–243.
- Radchenko A.G., G.W. Elmes & A. Alicata. 2006: Taxonomic revision of the schencki-group of the ant genus Myrmica Latreille (Hymenoptera: Formicidae) from the Palaearctic region. Annales Zoologici, 56(3): 499–538.
