= Myrmica lampra =

Conservation status
- Vulnerable (IUCN 2.3)

Scientific classification
- Domain: Eukaryota
- Kingdom: Animalia
- Phylum: Arthropoda
- Class: Insecta
- Order: Hymenoptera
- Family: Formicidae
- Subfamily: Myrmicinae
- Genus: Myrmica
- Species: M. lampra

Binomial name
- Myrmica lampra Francoeur, 1968

Species of ant

Myrmica lampra is a species of ant in the genus Myrmica. It is found in Quebec as was named in 1968 by Andre Francoeur. The species is evidently inquiline (it lives in the nest of other Myrmica species).
