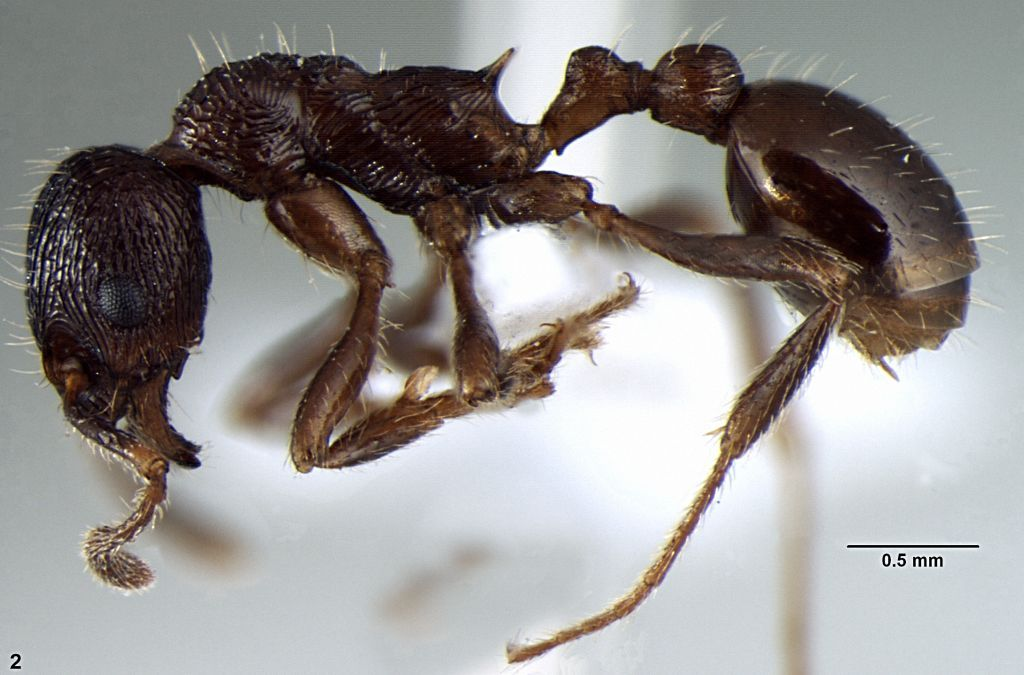
- M. elmesi worker from India

Scientific classification
- Domain: Eukaryota
- Kingdom: Animalia
- Phylum: Arthropoda
- Class: Insecta
- Order: Hymenoptera
- Family: Formicidae
- Subfamily: Myrmicinae
- Genus: Myrmica
- Species: M. elmesi

Binomial name
- Myrmica elmesi Bharti & Sharma, 2011

= Myrmica elmesi =

Species of ant

Myrmica elmesi is a species of ant in the subfamily Myrmicinae. The species, known from north-west Himalaya (India, Jammu and Kashmir), belongs to pachei group, and is significantly different from all other described species of this group.

== Distribution and habitat ==
Species has been collected from leaf litter in both the habitats. The collection site at Machedi has a patchy Cedrus forest along with agricultural land surrounding the site; moreover the area has lot of anthropogenic activities with a dry type of environment (mean temperature during collection period 32 °C, relative humidity 36.62%, annual rain fall 970 mm and thickness of leaf litter 2.1 cm). The collection site at Sarthal has dense Cedrus forest with abundant leaf litter, no agricultural land, it remains snow clad from November to beginning of March and has very limited anthropogenic activities with only nomads visiting the area (mean temperature during collection period 22 °C, relative humidity 66.38%, annual rain fall 1476 mm and thickness of leaf litter 3.9 cm) with comparatively wet environment.

This zone where the species is distributed is a transitional zone between sub temperate and temperate Himalaya and geographically it penetrates in to the Palearctic realm (whose boundary in Southern Asia is largely altitudinal, where an altitude of 2000–2500 meters above mean sea level forms the boundary between Palearctic and Indomalayan realms). Besides, Himalayan ecology is temperature-dependent. The snow line occurs at an average of 6000 meters above mean sea level and the timber line at an average of 3000 meters (the highest altitude at which the forest ends). With this sort of environment, the microclimate plays an important role for ants like Myrmica which prefer to live under stones or in rare cases in leaf litter, as the soil temperature is comparatively higher to ambient temperature in these habitats.
