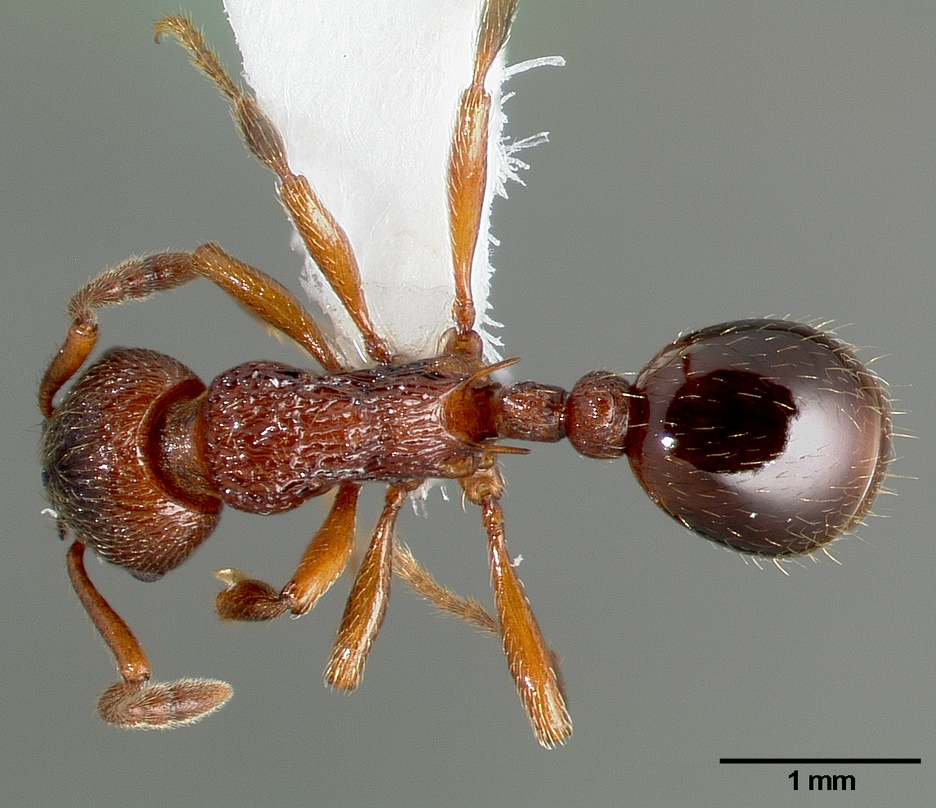

Scientific classification
- Domain: Eukaryota
- Kingdom: Animalia
- Phylum: Arthropoda
- Class: Insecta
- Order: Hymenoptera
- Family: Formicidae
- Subfamily: Myrmicinae
- Tribe: Myrmicini
- Genus: Myrmica
- Species: M. incompleta

Binomial name
- Myrmica incompleta Provancher, 1881

= Myrmica incompleta =

Species of ant

Myrmica incompleta is a species of ant in the family Formicidae.

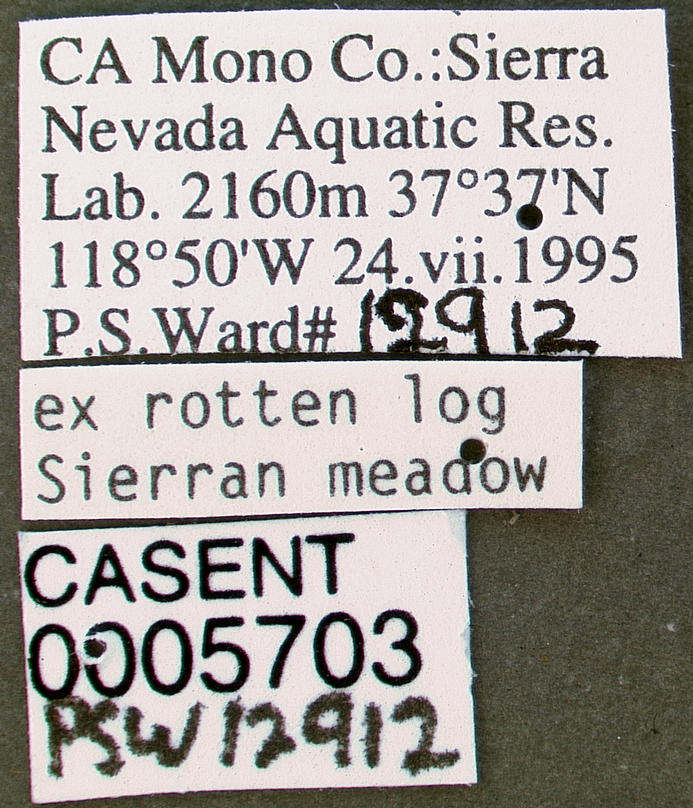

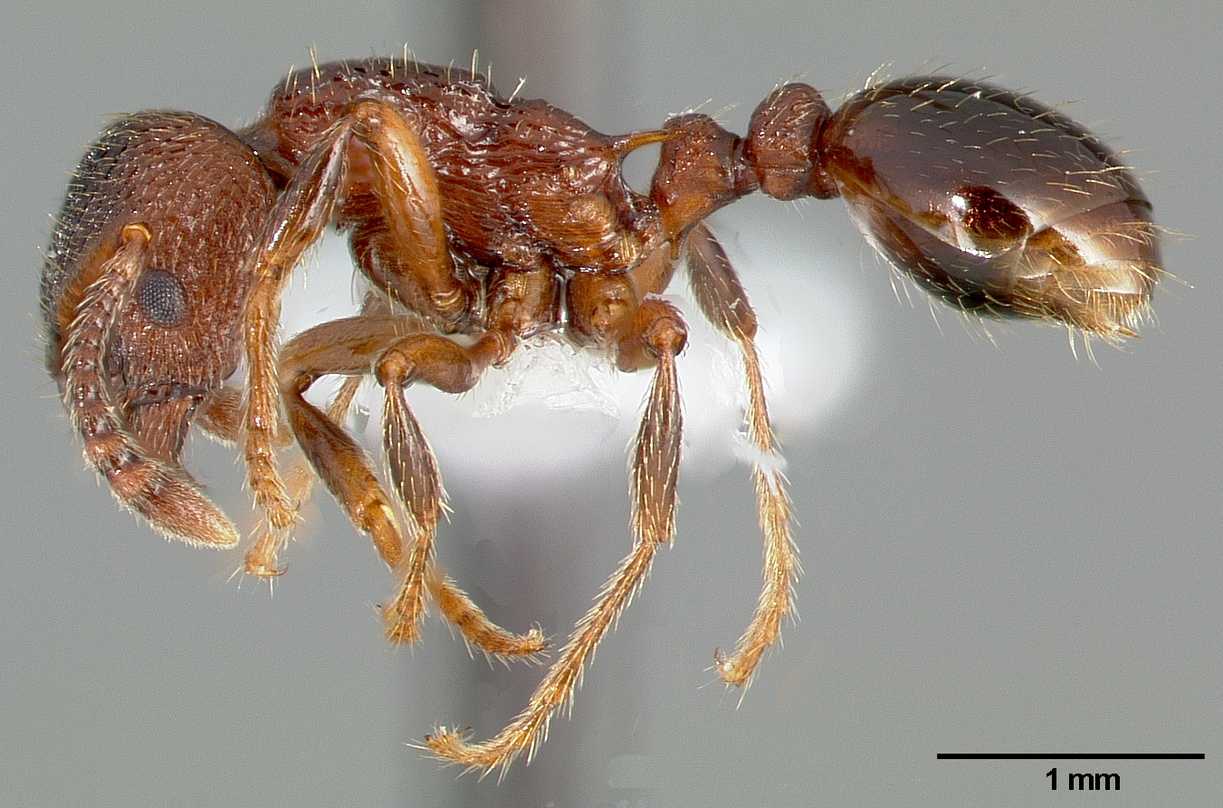
