= Myrmica cadusa =

Scientific classification
- Domain: Eukaryota
- Kingdom: Animalia
- Phylum: Arthropoda
- Class: Insecta
- Order: Hymenoptera
- Family: Formicidae
- Subfamily: Myrmicinae
- Genus: Myrmica
- Species: M. cadusa

Binomial name
- Myrmica cadusa Kim Park & Kim, 1997

Species of ant

Myrmica cadusa is a species of ant. Myrmica cadusa differs from similar ants in the genus Myrmica by the external shape of the antennal socket, which is jar shaped. They forage on the ground surface. Myrmica are unique from other types of ants in many ways. These are their oval head, rounded clypeus, prominent frontal lobes and in most species, a strongly developed propodeal spine with two large nodes.

== Features ==
Its body is a dark red/brown colour. The mandibles, antennae and legs are light brown, with long furrows which are brownish yellow with erect hairs all over it. The head is dark-reddish/brown and the same length as width. They have six black teeth, which get larger towards the end. Its eyes are dark brown and protruded. The antennae are 12 segments with an indistinct club of four segments. Antennal lobes with distinct jar because of frontal lobes connected by protrudent clypeus posterior margin. The thorax is dark-reddish/brown the same as the head.
