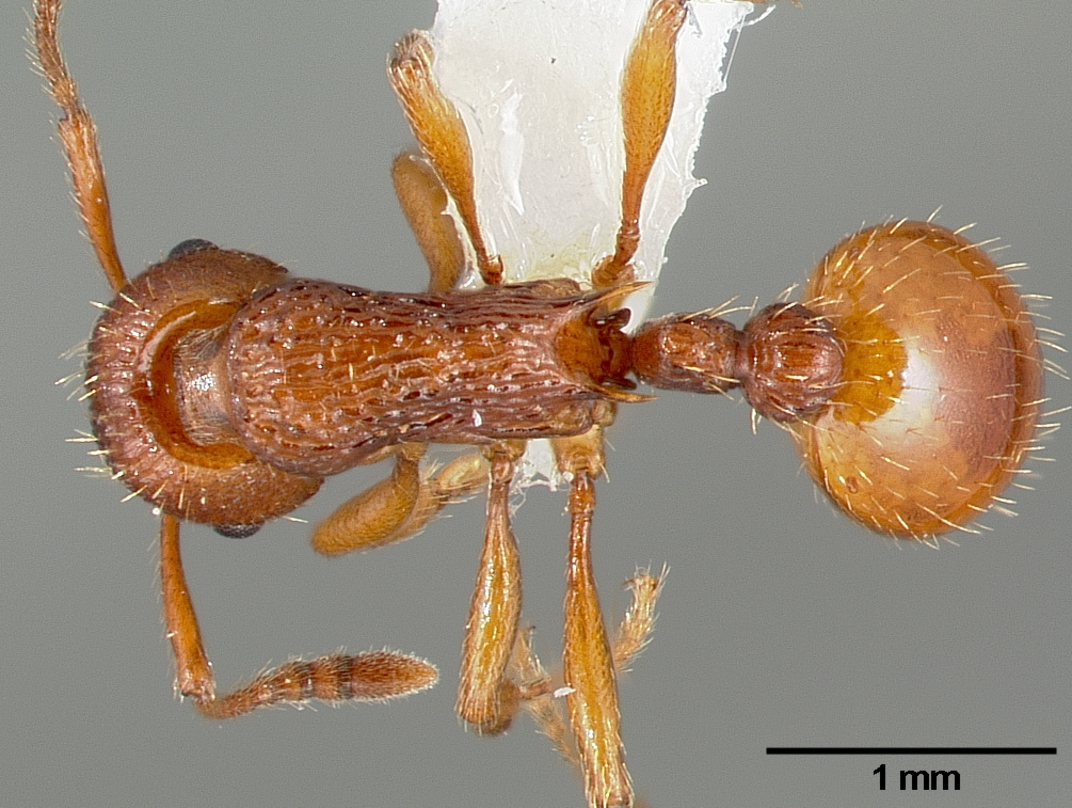

Scientific classification
- Domain: Eukaryota
- Kingdom: Animalia
- Phylum: Arthropoda
- Class: Insecta
- Order: Hymenoptera
- Family: Formicidae
- Subfamily: Myrmicinae
- Genus: Myrmica
- Species: M. americana

Binomial name
- Myrmica americana Weber, 1939
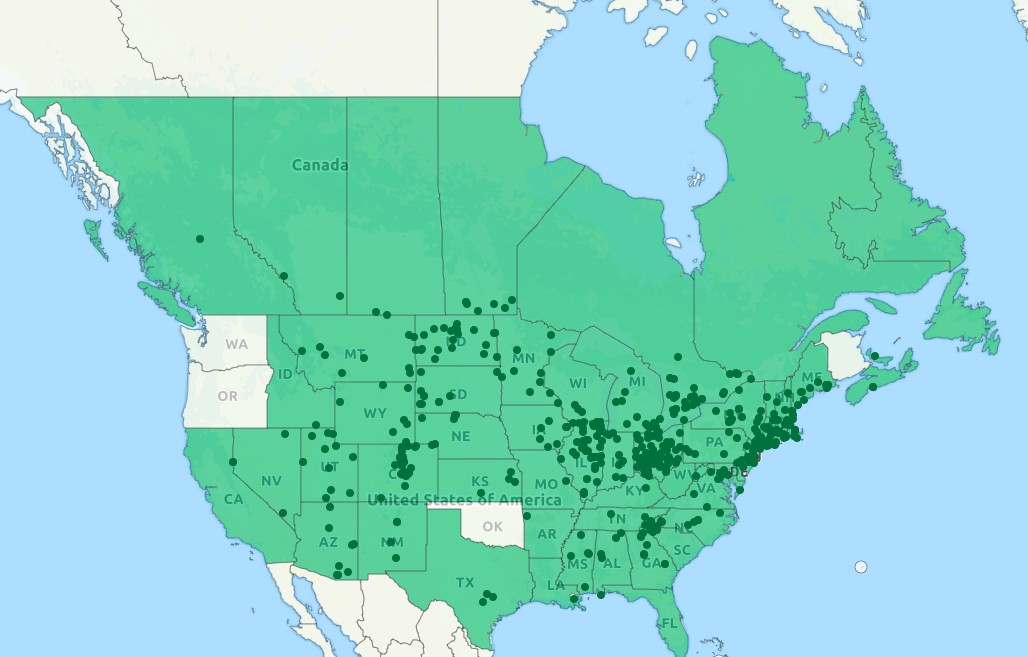

= Myrmica americana =

Species of ant

Myrmica americana is a species of ant in the family Myrmicinae. It can be found in all states in the U.S.A. besides Alaska, Hawaii, Oklahoma, Oregon, and Washington. It can also be found in all Canadian provinces besides New Brunswick, Yukon Territory, Northwest Territories, and Nunavut.

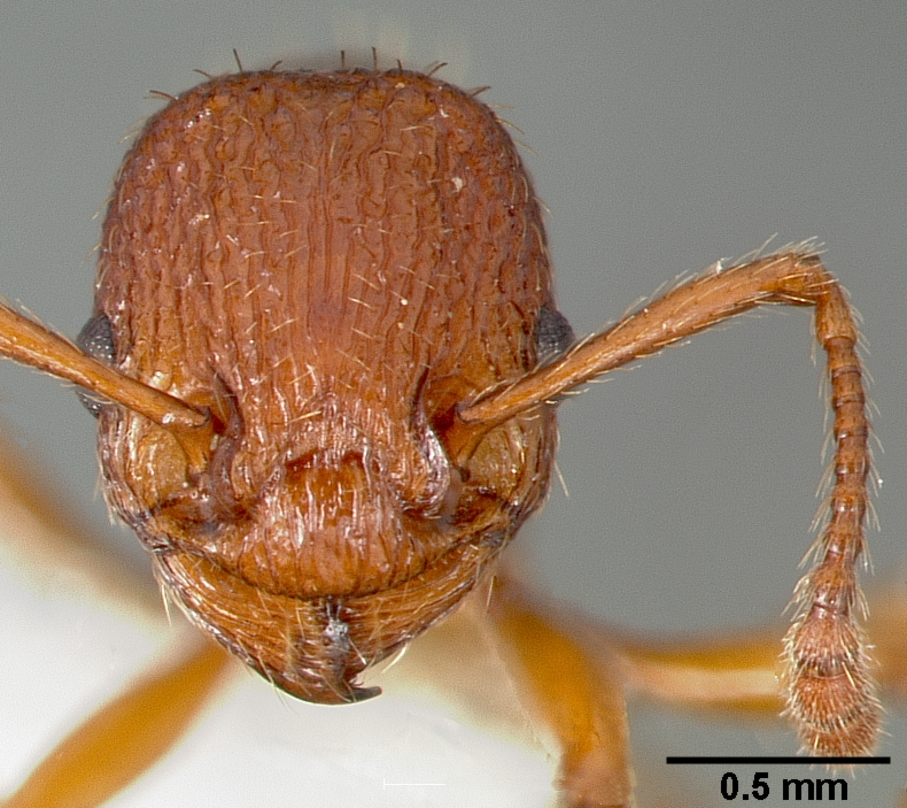

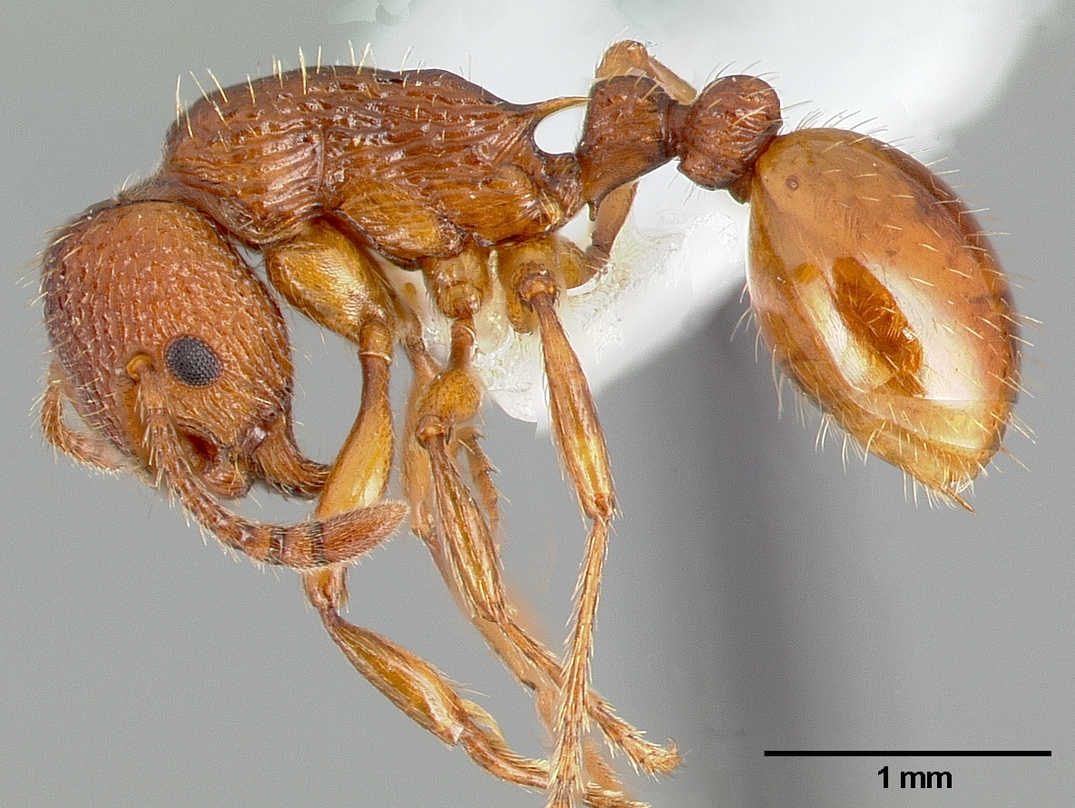
