= Myrmica laurae =

Conservation status
- Vulnerable (IUCN 2.3)

Scientific classification
- Domain: Eukaryota
- Kingdom: Animalia
- Phylum: Arthropoda
- Class: Insecta
- Order: Hymenoptera
- Family: Formicidae
- Subfamily: Myrmicinae
- Genus: Myrmica
- Species: M. laurae

Binomial name
- Myrmica laurae Emery, 1907

Species of ant

Myrmica laurae is a species of ant. It does not have a common name. The ant is found in Italy. It is considered vulnerable on the IUCN Red List.
