= Myrmica myrmicoxena =

Scientific classification
- Domain: Eukaryota
- Kingdom: Animalia
- Phylum: Arthropoda
- Class: Insecta
- Order: Hymenoptera
- Family: Formicidae
- Subfamily: Myrmicinae
- Genus: Myrmica
- Species: M. myrmicoxena

Binomial name
- Myrmica myrmicoxena Forel, 1895

Species of ant

Myrmica myrmicoxena is a species of ant that can be found in France and Spain.
