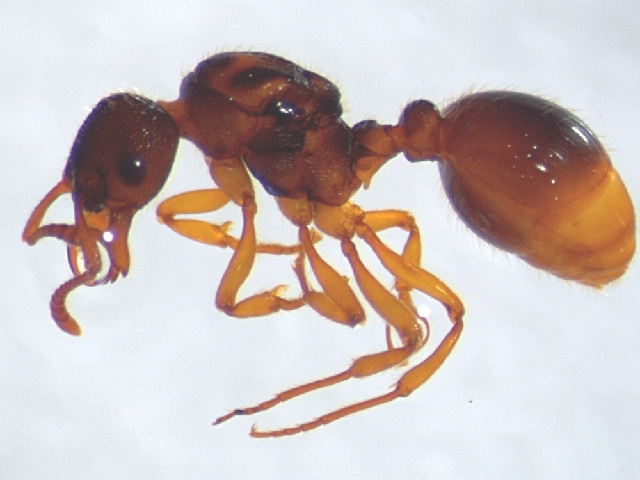

Scientific classification
- Domain: Eukaryota
- Kingdom: Animalia
- Phylum: Arthropoda
- Class: Insecta
- Order: Hymenoptera
- Family: Formicidae
- Subfamily: Myrmicinae
- Genus: Myrmica
- Species: M. vandeli

Binomial name
- Myrmica vandeli Bondroit, 1919

= Myrmica vandeli =

Species of ant

Myrmica vandeli is an ant species found sporadically across several European countries (Austria, Bulgaria, the Czech Republic, France, Germany, Great Britain, Poland, Romania, Spain, Sweden, Switzerland, Slovakia, western Ukraine, and the former Yugoslavia). It often coexists with M. scabrinodis. It lives in open, wet meadows. Nests are typically constructed in moss pads. Polygynous colonies may contain 1500 workers. Larvae of Phengaris butterflies may parasitize their colonies.
