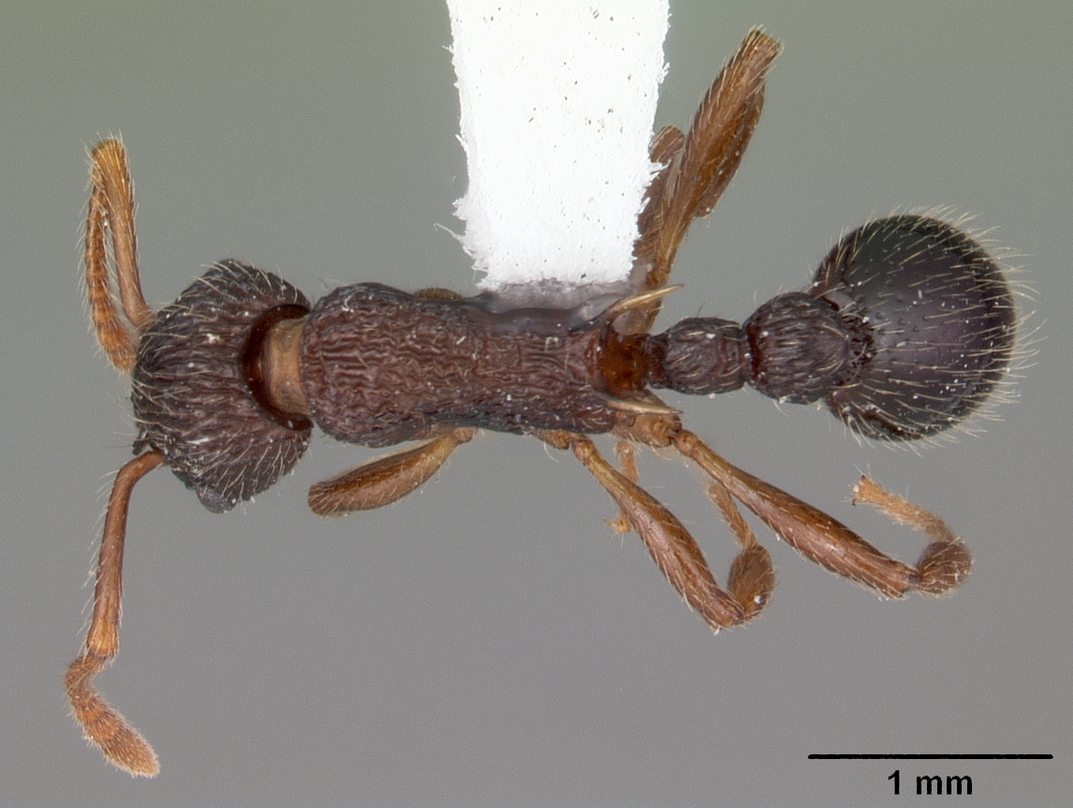

Scientific classification
- Domain: Eukaryota
- Kingdom: Animalia
- Phylum: Arthropoda
- Class: Insecta
- Order: Hymenoptera
- Family: Formicidae
- Subfamily: Myrmicinae
- Genus: Myrmica
- Species: M. punctiventris

Binomial name
- Myrmica punctiventris Roger, 1863

= Myrmica punctiventris =

Species of ant

Myrmica punctiventris is a species of ant in the family Formicidae.

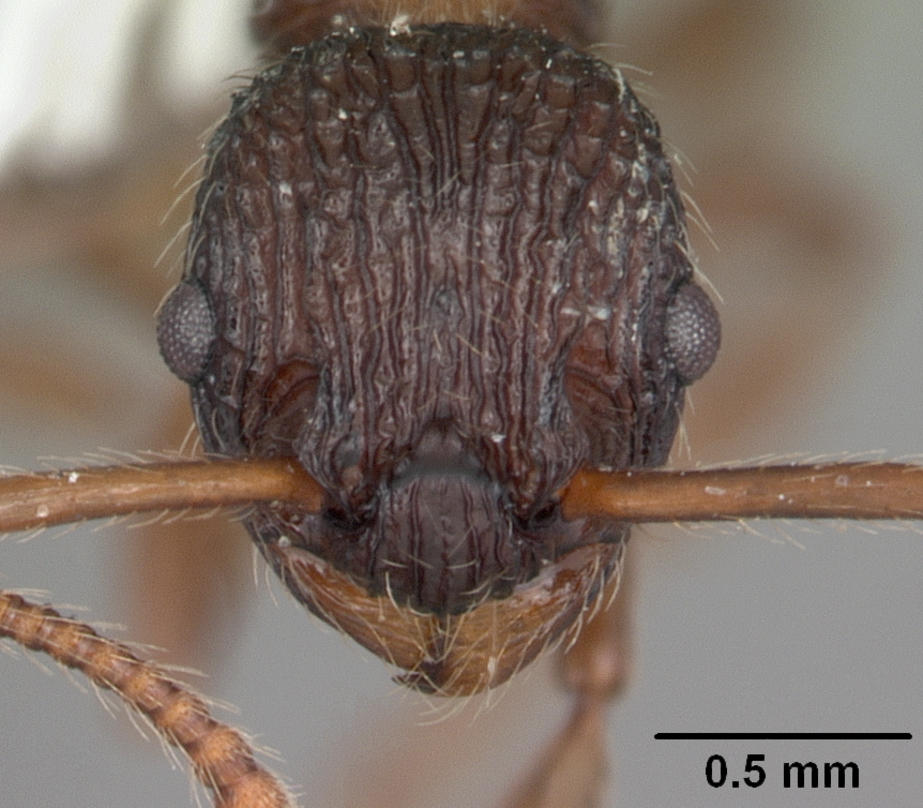

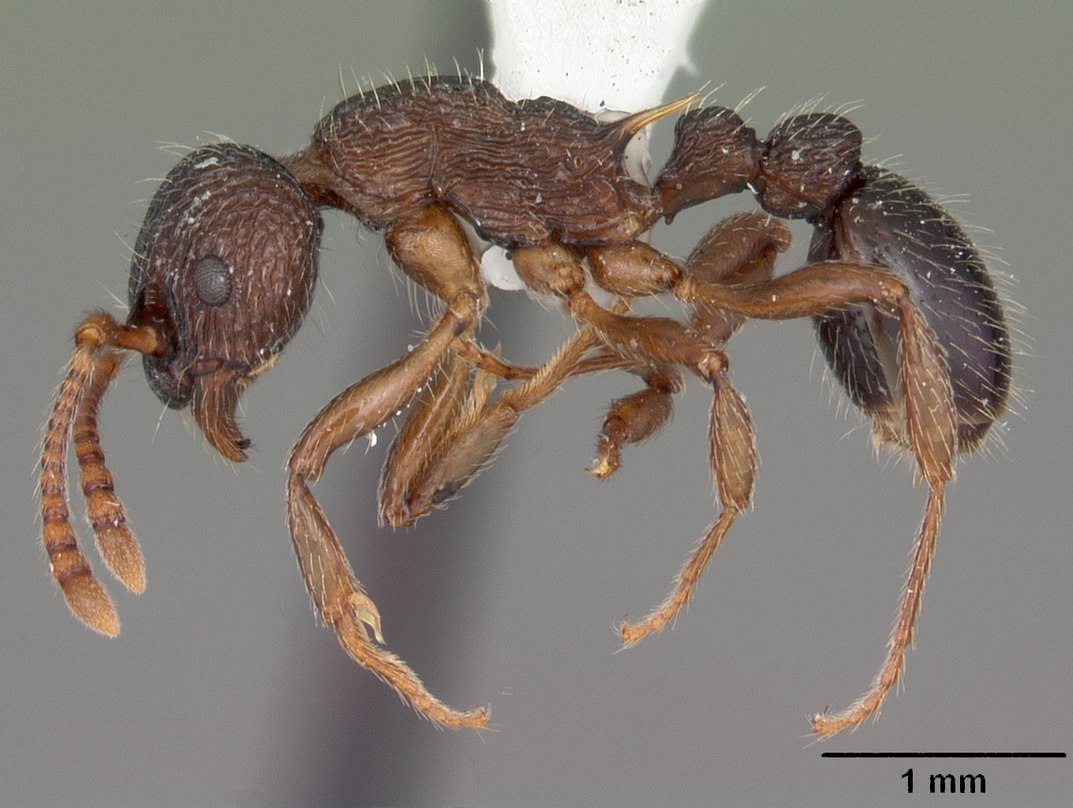
