= Myrmica laevinodis =

Scientific classification
- Kingdom: Animalia
- Phylum: Arthropoda
- Class: Insecta
- Order: Hymenoptera
- Family: Formicidae
- Subfamily: Myrmicinae
- Genus: Myrmica
- Species: M. laevinodis

Binomial name
- Myrmica laevinodis Nylander, 1846

Species of ant

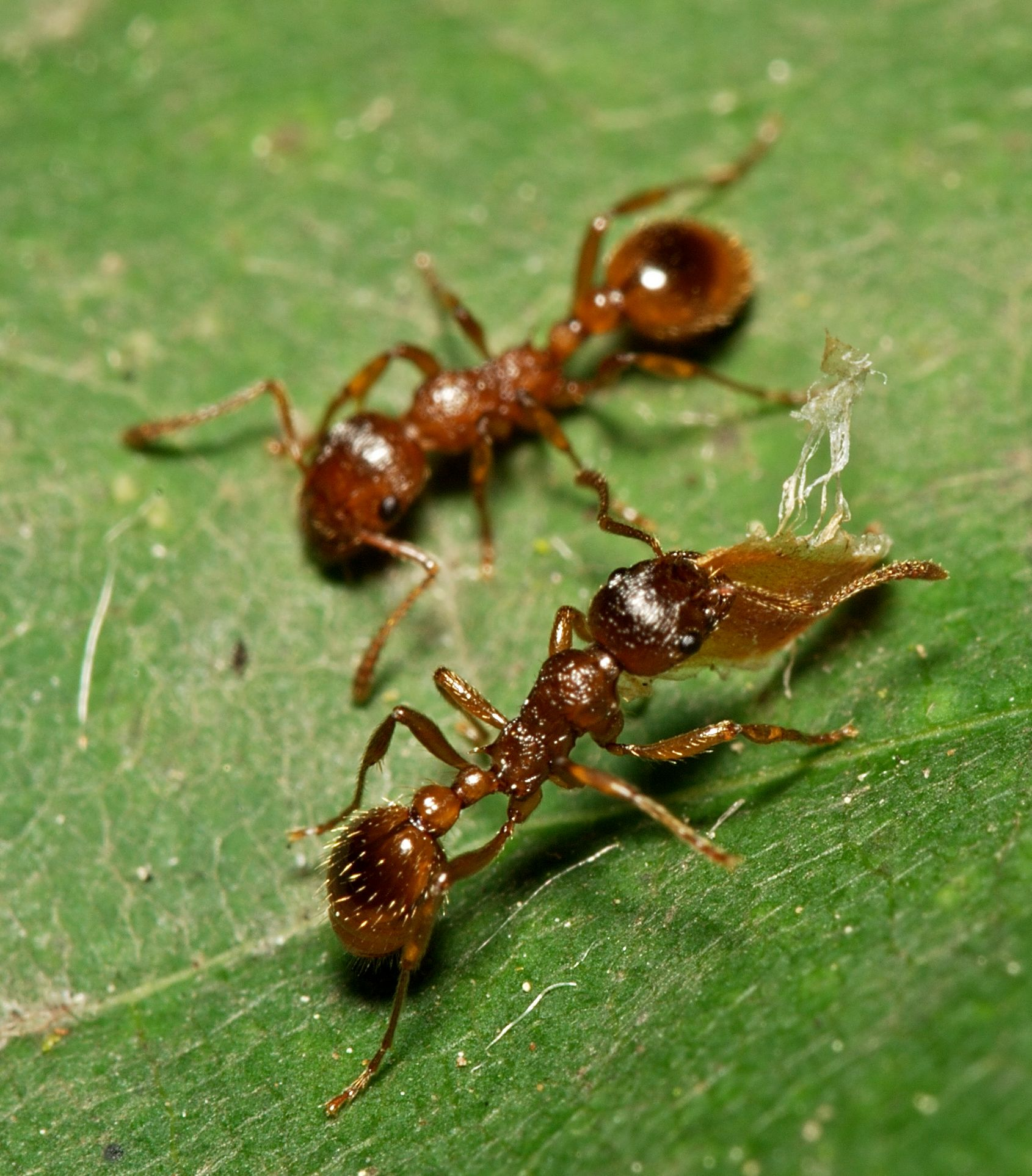

Myrmica laevinodis is an ant that is nowadays considered a junior synonym of Myrmica rubra.

Myrmica laevinodis have been known to feed on honeydew produced by aphids, in return for protecting them from parasites.
