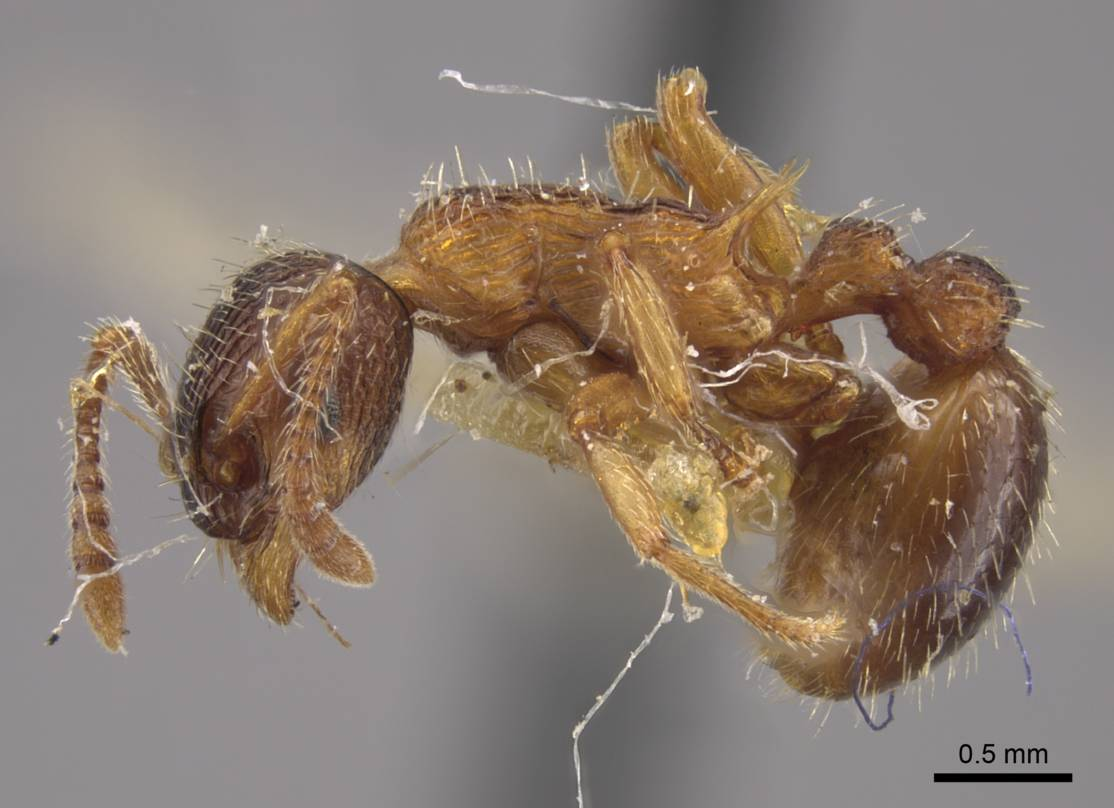

Scientific classification
- Domain: Eukaryota
- Kingdom: Animalia
- Phylum: Arthropoda
- Class: Insecta
- Order: Hymenoptera
- Family: Formicidae
- Subfamily: Myrmicinae
- Genus: Myrmica
- Species: M. ademonia

Binomial name
- Myrmica ademonia Bolton, 1995
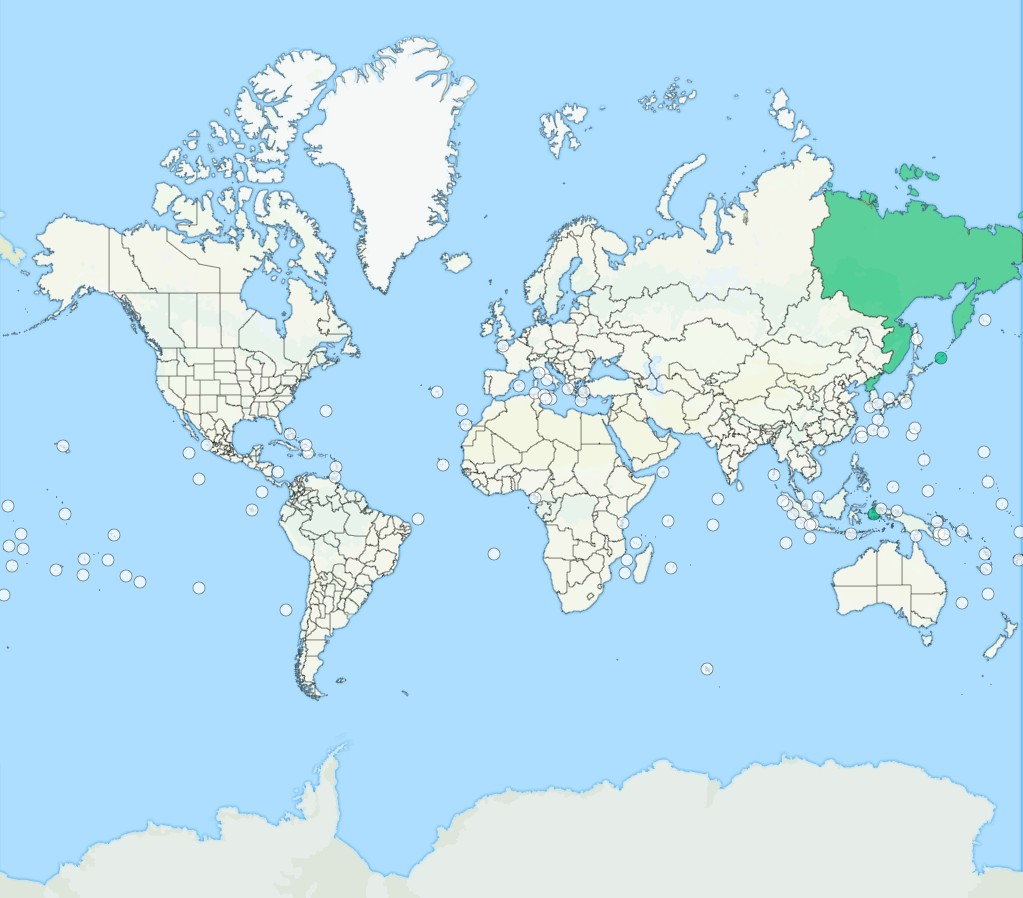

Synonyms
- Myrmica aspersa Kupyanskaya, 1990

= Myrmica ademonia =

Species of ant

Myrmica ademonia is a species of ant, originally described from Russia. It can be found in East Russia, Kuril Islands, North Korea, South Korea, and the Maluku Islands.
