= List of ants of Sweden =

Over 80 species of ants can be found in Sweden, distributed across 21 genera belonging to four subfamilies.

== Genera ==
- Dolichoderinae
  - Linepithema
  - Tapinoma
  - Technomyrmex
- Formicinae
  - Camponotus
  - Formica
  - Lasius
  - Paratrechina
  - Polyergus
- Myrmicinae
  - Anergates
  - Formicoxenus
  - Harpagoxenus
  - Leptothorax
  - Monomorium
  - Myrmecina
  - Myrmica
  - Solenopsis
  - Stenamma
  - Temnothorax
  - Tetramorium
  - Strongylognathus
- Ponerinae
  - Hypoponera

== Species ==
Subfamily	Species	Swedish name	Conservation status (Note: Conservation status in Sweden according to the Red List of the Swedish Species Information Center at the Swedish University of Agricultural Sciences: RE Extinct in Sweden (Regionally Extinct); CR Critically Endangered; EN Endangered; NT Near Threatened; LC Least Concern)	Image	Ref
Dolichoderinae	Linepithema humile (Note: Species only temporarily found in the county or feral population)	Invasionsmyra	—N/a		
Dolichoderinae	Tapinoma ambiguum	Alvarmyra	LC		
Dolichoderinae	Tapinoma melanocephalum	Mindre husmyra	—N/a		
Dolichoderinae	Technomyrmex albipes	Vitfotsmyra	—N/a		
Formicinae	Camponotus fallax	Ekhästmyra	CR		
Formicinae	Camponotus herculeanus	Hushästmyra	LC		
Formicinae	Camponotus ligniperda	Jordhästmyra	LC		
Formicinae	Camponotus vagus (Note: Extinct in Sweden)	Sothästmyra	RE		
Formicinae	Formica aquilonia	Nordskogsmyra	LC		
Formicinae	Formica bruni	Sydhedmyra	LC		
Formicinae	Formica cinerea	Gråmyra	LC		
Formicinae	Formica cunicularia	Brun slavmyra	LC		
Formicinae	Formica exsecta	Hårig hedmyra	LC		
Formicinae	Formica foreli	Matt hedmyra	LC		
Formicinae	Formica forsslundi	Mindre hedmyra	LC		
Formicinae	Formica fusca	Svart slavmyra	LC		
Formicinae	Formica gagatoides	Fjällmyra	LC		
Formicinae	Formica lemani	Nordslavmyra	LC		
Formicinae	Formica lugubris	Hårig skogsmyra	LC		
Formicinae	Formica lusatica	Större slavmyra	LC		
Formicinae	Formica picea	Vitmossmyra	LC		
Formicinae	Formica polyctena	Kal skogsmyra	LC		
Formicinae	Formica pratensis	Ängsmyra	LC		
Formicinae	Formica pressilabris	Blank hedmyra	LC		
Formicinae	Formica rufa	Röd skogsmyra	LC		
Formicinae	Formica rufibarbis	Röd slavmyra	LC		
Formicinae	Formica sanguinea	Blodröd rövarmyra	LC		
Formicinae	Formica suecica	Ljus hedmyra	LC		
Formicinae	Formica transkaukasica	Vitmossemyra	LC		
Formicinae	Formica truncorum	Stubbmyra	LC		
Formicinae	Formica uralensis	Uralmyra	LC		
Formicinae	Lasius alienus	Hedjordmyra	LC		
Formicinae	Lasius bicornis	Stubbjordmyra	EN		
Formicinae	Lasius brunneus	Brun trämyra	LC		
Formicinae	Lasius carniolicus	Citronjordmyra	LC		
Formicinae	Lasius flavus	Gul tuvmyra	LC		
Formicinae	Lasius fuliginosus	Blanksvart trämyra	LC		
Formicinae	Lasius meridionalis	Kustjordmyra	LC		
Formicinae	Lasius mixtus	Vinterjordmyra	LC		
Formicinae	Lasius niger	trädgårdsmyra	LC		
Formicinae	Lasius paralienus	kalkjordmyra	LC		
Formicinae	Lasius platythorax	Skogsjordmyra	LC		
Formicinae	Lasius psammophilus	Sandjordmyra	LC		
Formicinae	Lasius sabularum	Höstjordmyra	LC		
Formicinae	Lasius umbratus	Ängsjordmyra	LC		
Formicinae	Paratrechina longicornis	Slank växthusmyra	—N/a		
Formicinae	Paratrechina vividula	Hårig växthusmyra	—N/a		
Formicinae	Polyergus rufescens	Amasonmyra	CR		
Myrmicinae	Anergates atratulus	Gökmyra	LC		
Myrmicinae	Formicoxenus nitidulus	Gästmyra	LC		
Myrmicinae	Harpagoxenus sublaevis	Rostbrun rövarmyra	LC		
Myrmicinae	Leptothorax acervorum	Hårig smalmyra	LC		
Myrmicinae	Leptothorax goesswaldi	Parasitsmalmyra	CR		
Myrmicinae	Leptothorax gredleri	Eksmalmyra	LC		
Myrmicinae	Leptothorax kutteri	Snyltsmalmyra	LC		
Myrmicinae	Leptothorax muscorum	Tallsmalmyra	LC		
Myrmicinae	Monomorium floricola	Mörk faraomyra	—N/a		
Myrmicinae	Monomorium pharaonis	Faraomyra	LC		
Myrmicinae	Myrmecina graminicola	Trögmyra	LC		
Myrmicinae	Myrmica gallienii	Strandrödmyra	LC		
Myrmicinae	Myrmica hellenica (Note: Uncertain distribution)	Mindre rödmyra	—N/a		
Myrmicinae	Myrmica hirsuta	Hårig rödmyra	LC		
Myrmicinae	Myrmica karavajevi	Snyltrödmyra	LC		
Myrmicinae	Myrmica lobicornis	Mörk rödmyra	LC		
Myrmicinae	Myrmica lonae	Skålrödmyra	LC		
Myrmicinae	Myrmica rubra	Trädgårdsrödmyra	LC		
Myrmicinae	Myrmica ruginodis	Skogsrödmyra	LC		
Myrmicinae	Myrmica rugulosa	Sandrödmyra	LC		
Myrmicinae	Myrmica sabuleti	Hedrödmyra	LC		
Myrmicinae	Myrmica scabrinodis	Ängsrödmyra	LC		
Myrmicinae	Myrmica schencki	Fältrödmyra	LC		
Myrmicinae	Myrmica specioides	Dynrödmyra	NT		
Myrmicinae	Myrmica sulcinodis	Större rödmyra	LC		
Myrmicinae	Myrmica vandeli	Prydlig rödmyra	LC		
Myrmicinae	Solenopsis fugax	Tjuvmyra	EN		
Myrmicinae	Stenamma debile	Skuggmyra	LC		
Myrmicinae	Strongylognathus testaceus (Note: Possibly extinct in Sweden)	sabelmyra	EN		
Myrmicinae	Temnothorax affinis	Kvistsmalmyra	LC		
Myrmicinae	Temnothorax corticalis	Barksmalmyra	LC		
Myrmicinae	Temnothorax interruptus	Hedsmalmyra	NT		
Myrmicinae	Temnothorax nylanderi	Skogssmalmyra	LC		
Myrmicinae	Temnothorax parvulus	Busksmalmyra	LC		
Myrmicinae	Temnothorax tuberum	Mörkhuvad smalmyra	LC		
Myrmicinae	Tetramorium caespitum	Grästorvmyra	LC		
Ponerinae	Hypoponera punctatissima	Kompostmyra	LC		

== Endangered species ==
The Red List of the Swedish Species Information Center at the Swedish University of Agricultural Sciences lists two species as near threatened and six threatened: three endangered and three critically endangered. (Note: "Red-listed Species in Sweden 2010" is the third and latest (2013) red list published by the Swedish Species Information Center (ArtDatabanken)) One species, Camponotus vagus, is extinct in Sweden, but is still widespread in Central Europe.

- Near Threatened (NT)
  - Myrmica specioides
  - Temnothorax interruptus
- Endangered (EN)
  - Lasius bicornis
  - Solenopsis fugax
  - Strongylognathus testaceus
- Critically Endangered (CR)
  - Camponotus fallax
  - Polyergus rufescens
  - Leptothorax goesswaldi
- Extinct in Sweden (Regionally Extinct; RE)
  - Camponotus vagus
