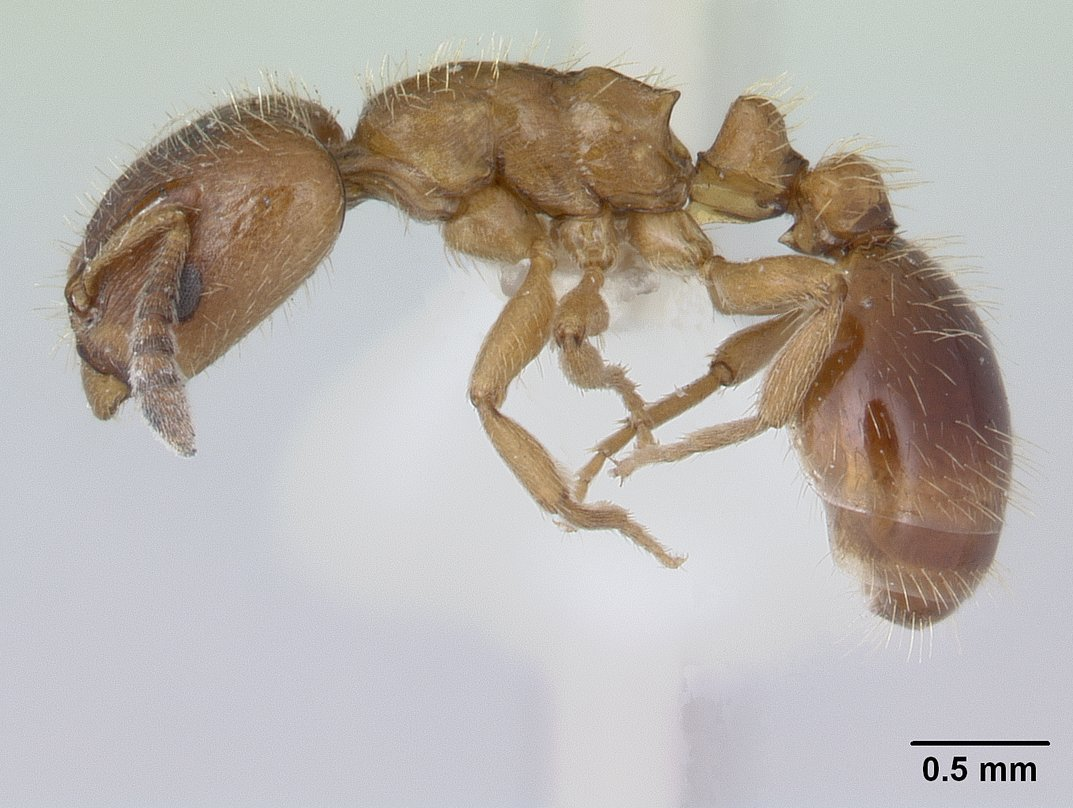
- Harpagoxenus sublaevis worker

Conservation status
- Vulnerable (IUCN 2.3)

Scientific classification
- Kingdom: Animalia
- Phylum: Arthropoda
- Class: Insecta
- Order: Hymenoptera
- Family: Formicidae
- Subfamily: Myrmicinae
- Genus: Harpagoxenus
- Species: H. sublaevis

Binomial name
- Harpagoxenus sublaevis Nylander, 1849

= Harpagoxenus sublaevis =

Species of ant

Harpagoxenus sublaevis is a species of ant in the subfamily Myrmicinae. It is found in Austria, France, Germany, Italy, and Switzerland.

== Range and habitat ==
Harpagoxenus sublaevis is found in European mountain ranges up to 2400 meters. It can be found in the following regions: Russia, Italy, Norway, Germany, Denmark, Albania, Turkey, Romania, and Bulgaria. The ant predominantly lives in bogs, forests, and mountain slopes. These habitats suit it since it builds its nests in rotting logs and stumps, underneath bark, and under rocks.

== Morphology ==
Harpagoxenus sublaevis is a yellow to brown ant that has different morphs within the species depending on their role in the colony. Queens are larger and do the majority of reproduction for the colony. The queen creates sister workers who are highly related to one another and can themselves be fertile. The workers may be winged or not winged. Workers will also vary in size depending on nutrient availability and even what their host species is. The host species is also slightly altered in their morphology in that the host females are never fertile. Workers can vary in size, ocelli and thoracic structure, as well as reproductive ability.

== Reproduction ==
Harpagoxenus sublaevis, like many ant species, is female dominant. The queen produces workers who are predominantly female. This is backed up by the enforcing of monogyny within the colonies through aggression in females. In these colonies the females form a sexual dominance hierarchy based on aggressive behavior. The vast majority of females will not mate and many will not even be fertile. In both queen-right and queen-less colonies there may be a few non-queen females who are able to lay eggs. However, it has been shown that in colonies with a queen the queen does inhibit fertilization and egg laying in other females. In most cases the females stop other females from laying eggs with aggression. When females are fertilized, eggs are laid anywhere from 8–47 days later.

Harpagoxenus sublaevis also exhibits interesting mating behavior. When ready to mate, females will exit the nest and climb nearby vegetation such as some grass or a twig and stay there with their gaster erect. The ants then produce a sexual pheromone, which is used to attract males and entice them to mate. This behavior occurs during the summer when it is hot and dry outside and in the evening. The females will remain in their position calling for a mate until mated or until it is dark. Once it is dark they disappear until the next day when they return to calling for a mate.

== Colonies ==
Harpagoxenus sublaevis colonies are believed to have a lifetime of about ten years. To establish new colonies, a fertilized queen will penetrate a host colony within ten days after mating. Next the queen will kill the host queen and use pheromones to help take over. The queen then lays her egg which are propagated by the first slaves. H. sublaevis is parasitic towards a genus of ant called Leptothorax. Two main species are parasitized: L. acervorum and L. muscorum, and there does not appear to be a preference in host between these two species. They can even be found in the same colony as each other, and can engage in highly aggressive behavior.

== Slave raids ==
Slave raids occur largely during the same time of year as the sexual calling from female H. sublaevis happens. Since hosts are never fertile, and thus do not reproduce, all slaves must be stolen as larvae or pupae. These raids are very violent and destructive and cause the host species' colony to suffer a significant reduction in life expectancy. The main tool used by H. sublaevis to facilitate raids is a chemical they excrete from their cuticle during colony establishment and slave raids which alters the behavior of the host species. The chemical causes the host to fight each other with extreme aggression, in most cases killing each other. This has also been shown to instead cause the host to flee which helps the population survive the raid. However, their larvae and pupae are still stolen to be used as slaves by H. sublaevis.

== Subspecies ==
- Harpagoxenus sublaevis caucasicus Arnol'di, 1968
