= Leptothorax athabasca =

Scientific classification
- Kingdom: Animalia
- Phylum: Arthropoda
- Clade: Pancrustacea
- Class: Insecta
- Order: Hymenoptera
- Family: Formicidae
- Subfamily: Myrmicinae
- Genus: Leptothorax
- Species: L. athabasca

Binomial name
- Leptothorax athabasca Buschinger, A. & Schulz, A., 2008

Species of ant

Leptothorax athabasca has been discovered and described by Buschinger, A. & Schulz, A. in 2008. It is endemic to the area around Athabasca Falls in Alberta, Canada.
