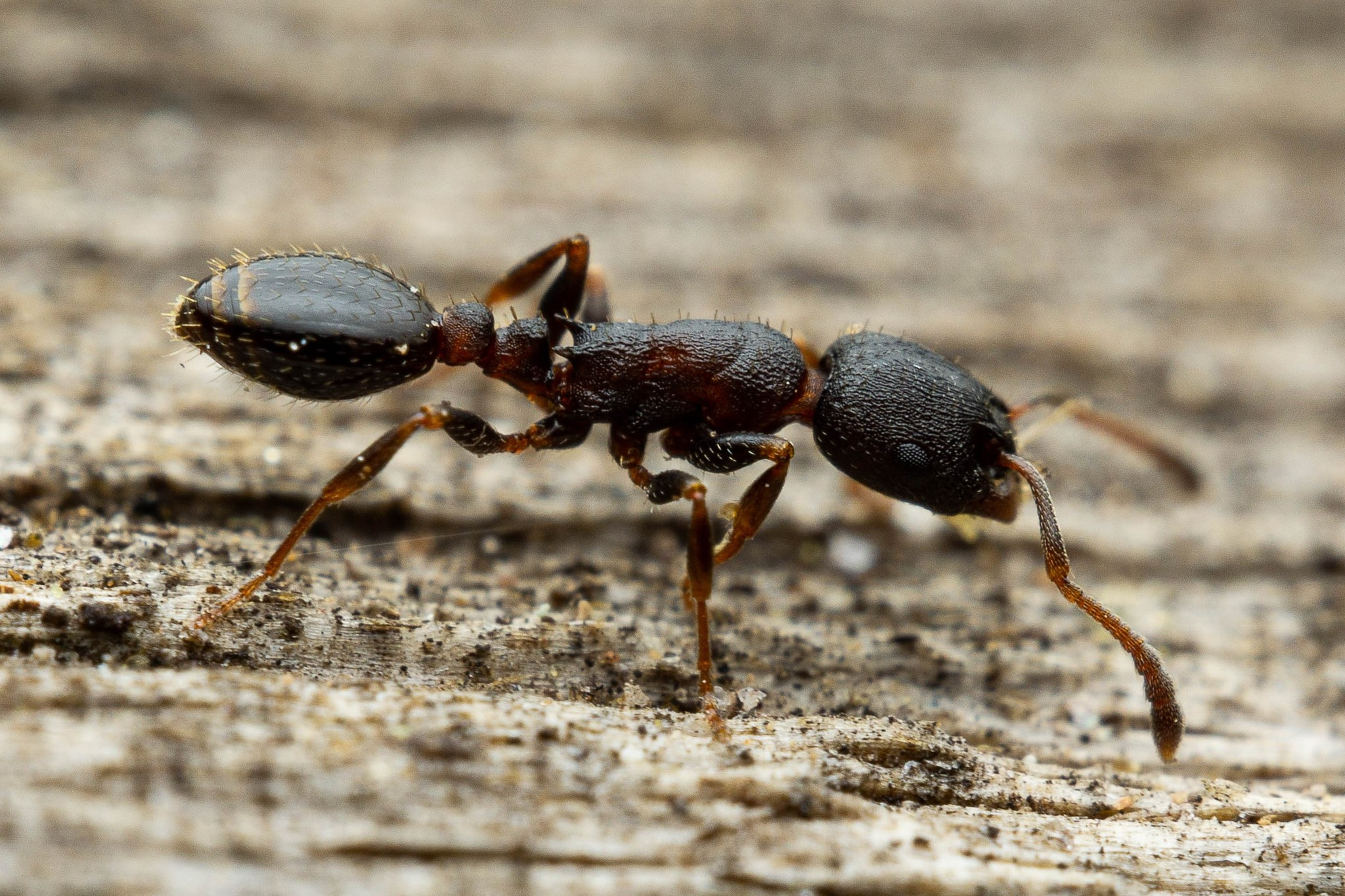

Scientific classification
- Kingdom: Animalia
- Phylum: Arthropoda
- Class: Insecta
- Order: Hymenoptera
- Family: Formicidae
- Subfamily: Myrmicinae
- Tribe: Crematogastrini
- Genus: Leptothorax
- Species: L. crassipilis

Binomial name
- Leptothorax crassipilis Wheeler, 1917

= Leptothorax crassipilis =

Species of ant

Leptothorax crassipilis is a species of ant in the family Formicidae.

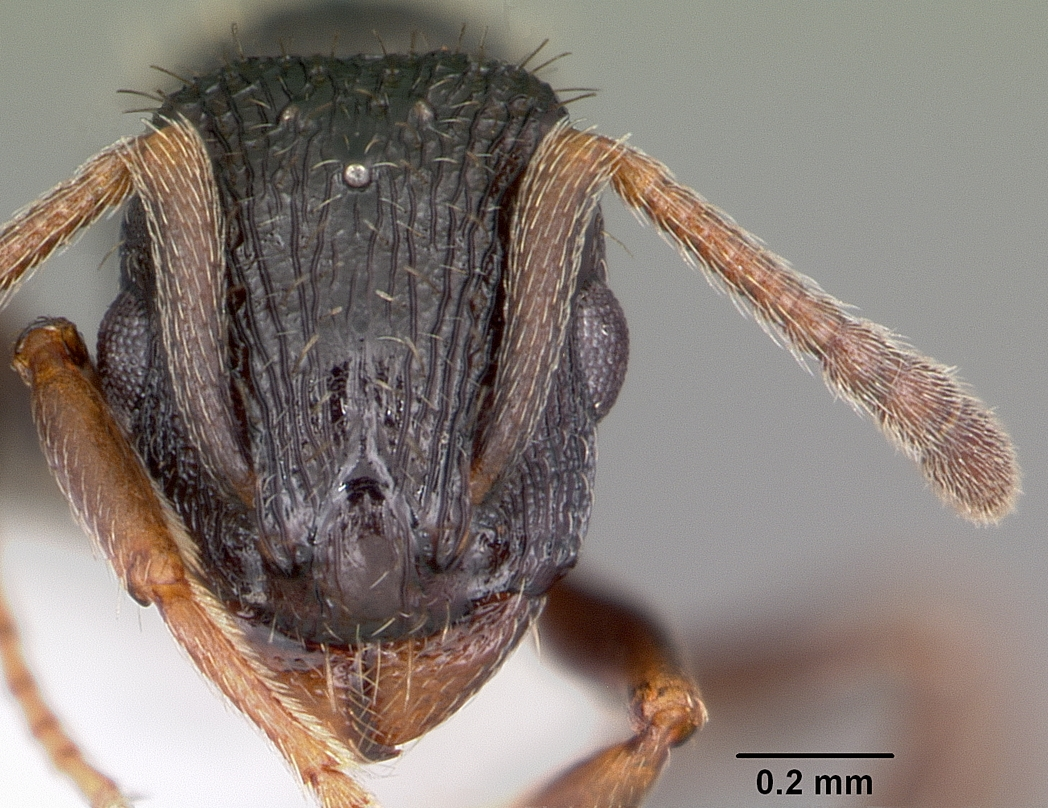

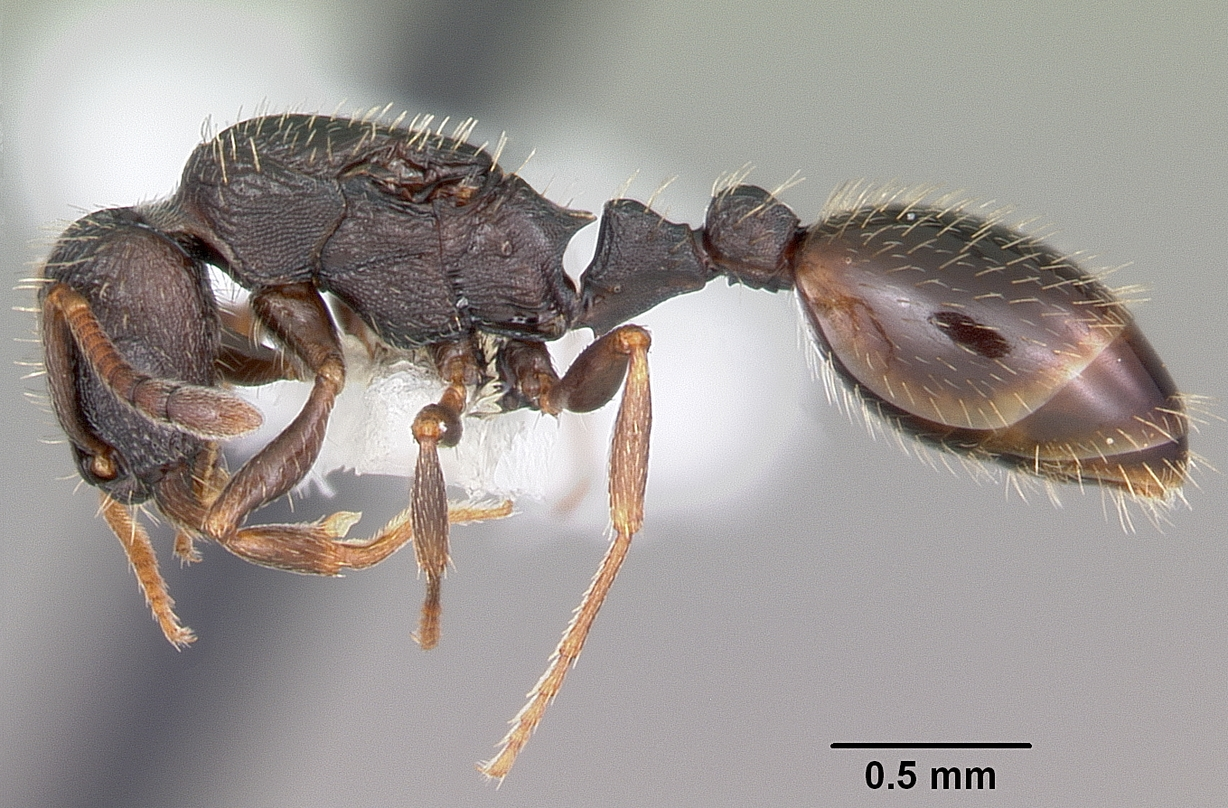
