= Harpagoxenus zaisanicus =

Conservation status
- Vulnerable (IUCN 2.3)

Scientific classification
- Kingdom: Animalia
- Phylum: Arthropoda
- Class: Insecta
- Order: Hymenoptera
- Family: Formicidae
- Subfamily: Myrmicinae
- Genus: Harpagoxenus
- Species: H. zaisanicus

Binomial name
- Harpagoxenus zaisanicus Pisarski, 1963

Synonyms
- Harapgoxenus zaisanicus Pisarski, 1963 [orth. error]

Species of ant

Harpagoxenus zaisanicus is a species of ant in the subfamily Myrmicinae. It is endemic to Mongolia.
