= Leptothorax faberi =

Conservation status
- Vulnerable (IUCN 2.3)

Scientific classification
- Kingdom: Animalia
- Phylum: Arthropoda
- Clade: Pancrustacea
- Class: Insecta
- Order: Hymenoptera
- Family: Formicidae
- Subfamily: Myrmicinae
- Genus: Leptothorax
- Species: L. faberi

Binomial name
- Leptothorax faberi Buschlinger, 1983

Species of ant

Leptothorax faberi is a species of ant in the genus Leptothorax. It is endemic to Canada.
