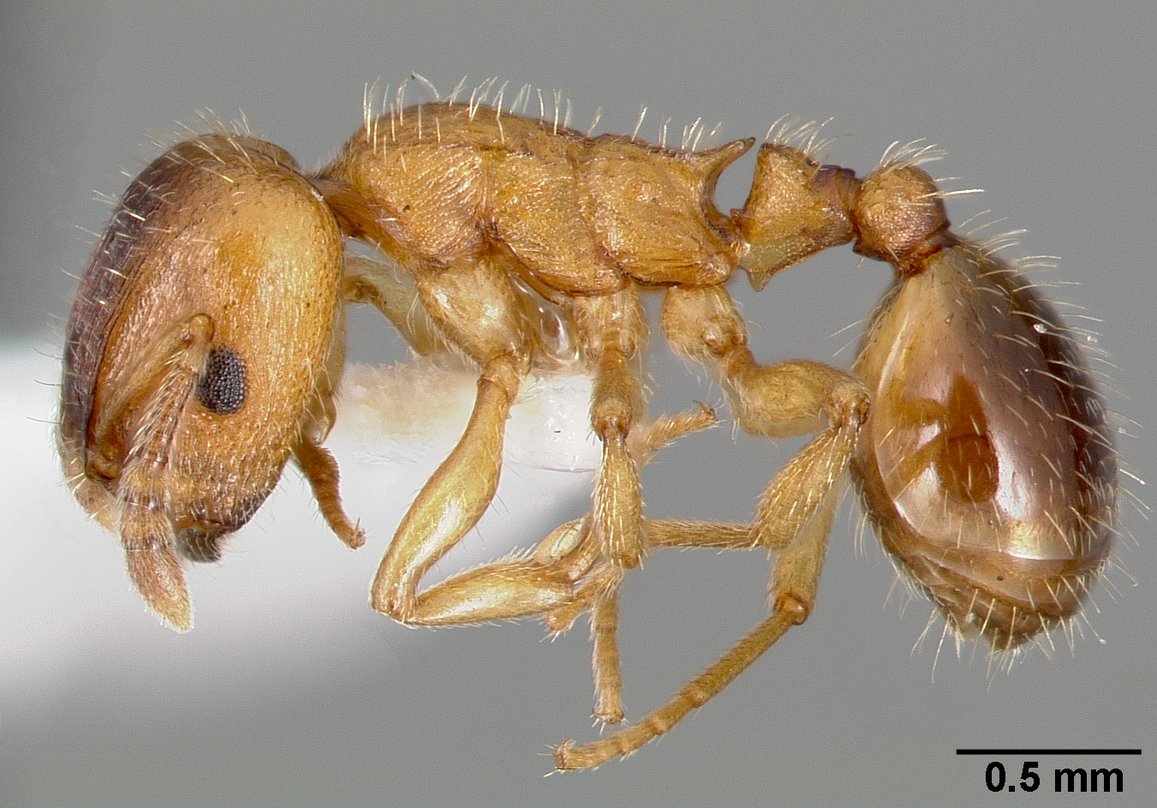
- Harpagoxenus canadensis worker

Conservation status
- Vulnerable (IUCN 2.3)

Scientific classification
- Kingdom: Animalia
- Phylum: Arthropoda
- Class: Insecta
- Order: Hymenoptera
- Family: Formicidae
- Subfamily: Myrmicinae
- Genus: Harpagoxenus
- Species: H. canadensis

Binomial name
- Harpagoxenus canadensis Smith, 1939

= Harpagoxenus canadensis =

Species of ant

Harpagoxenus canadensis is a species of ant in the subfamily Myrmicinae. It is found in Canada and the United States.
