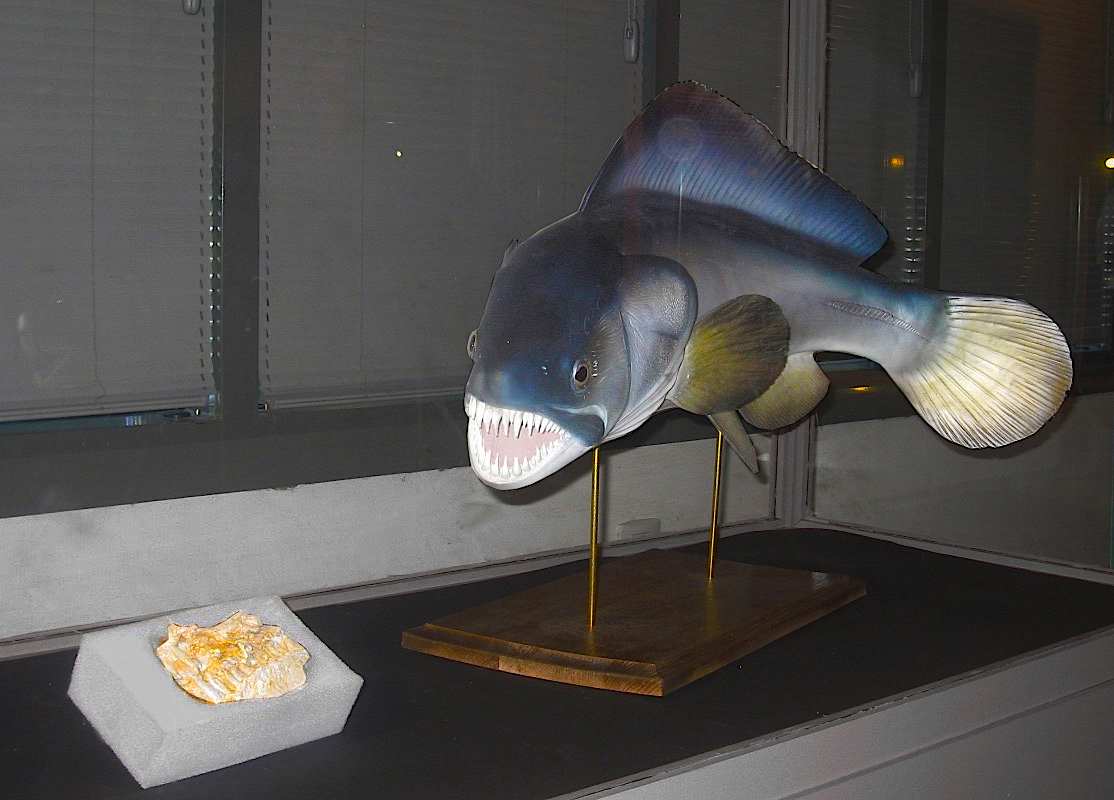
- Restoration of T. gigeri at Muséum départemental du Var (France)

Scientific classification
- Kingdom: Animalia
- Phylum: Chordata
- Class: Actinopterygii
- Clade: Halecomorphi
- Order: Amiiformes
- Family: †Tomognathidae; Jordan, 1923
- Genus: †Tomognathus; Dixon, 1850

Species
- †Tomognathus mordax Dixon, 1850; †Tomognathus gigeri Cavin and Giner, 2012

= Tomognathus =

Tomognathus Temporal range: Valanginian to Turonian

Extinct genus of ray-finned fishes

Tomognathus was a halecomorph fish related to the modern bowfin that lived in the Cretaceous Period. It was named by Dixon in 1850.

The name Tomognathus was also later applied to a modern species of ant by Mayr in 1861. But since the name was already taken it came instead to be classified as Harpagoxenus.
