= Chronic bee paralysis virus =

Virus which infects bees

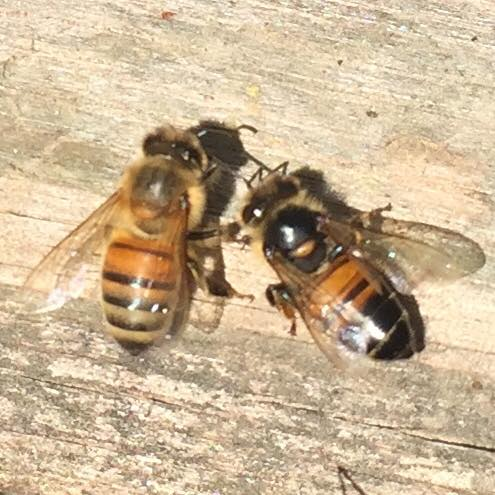
The blackness on the bee on the right is a symptom of CBPV.

Chronic bee paralysis virus (CBPV) commonly affects adult Apis mellifera honey bees and causes a chronic paralysis that can easily spread to other members of a colony. Bees infected with CBPV begin to show symptoms after 5 days and die a few days after. Chronic bee paralysis virus infection is a factor that can contribute to or cause the sudden collapse of honeybee colonies. Since honeybees serve a vital role in ecological resilience, it is important to understand factors and diseases that threaten them.

Although CBPV infects mainly adult bees, the virus can also infect bees in earlier developmental stages, though developing bees typically have significantly lower viral loads compared to their adult counterparts. Death as a result of CBPV infection in developing bees or brood losses due to viral infection are low or nonexistent.

Bees that have been infected with CBPV may harbor millions of viral particles, with half of them concentrated in the head region of the infected honey bee. As a result, the virus has neurotropic activity, allowing the virus to cause nervous system damage in infected honey bees. Specifically, research has identified that viral particles concentrate primarily in two centers of the brain to replicate after infecting the host. The first replication center is the mushroom bodies, which play a role in sensory processing, memory, learning, and motor control, and the second replication center the central body, the center of the insect brain that primarily control locomotion, behavior, bodily orientation, and arousal.

== Virology ==
Chronic bee paralysis virus shares similarities to the virus families Nodaviridae and Tombusviridae, but CBPV is distinct enough from the two existing families and consequently is considered a new family of viruses. As a result, CBPV has yet to be fully classified. Chronic bee paralysis virus is a single-stranded positive-RNA virus with five fragments, two large fragments and three small fragments. The first large fragment is suspected to encode an RNA-dependent RNA polymerase, as it possesses 8 conserved domains of an RNA-dependent RNA polymerase. The second large fragment is thought to encode for the virus capsid protein, which is reported to be a capsid protein of 23.5 kDa and four polypeptides of 75, 50, 30 and 20 kDa. The virus capsid is hypothesized to have icosahedral symmetry.

Chronic bee paralysis virus is also found to facilitate the growth and reproduction of a satellite virus, called Chronic bee paralysis associate satellite virus (CBPSV), which has three small (+) single-stranded RNA fragments. The three small (+) single-stranded RNA fragments appear inconsistently in the Chronic bee paralysis virus, which lends to the idea that the three RNAs are not components of CBPV but of a satellite virus that relies on CBPV activity in order to proliferate. Additionally, the three small RNA fragments each have molecular weights of 0.35 million (1100 nucleotides), which exactly matches the molecular weights of the three (+) ssRNA fragments of CBVA.

== Infection and transmission ==
Chronic bee paralysis virus is transmitted through two main mechanisms. The first mechanism is viral transmission through bee feces, which remains on the hive floor and can be picked up on the furry legs of other bees and ingested orally. The second mechanism is through close contact between bees in the hive. Worker bees are the most susceptible to infection, since they travel the hive most frequently. The infection may spread between hives as a result of indirect contact or direct contact between honey bees. Research shows that mainly adult honey bees can be infected with chronic bee paralysis virus by a topical contact with infected feces or by ingestion of virion-containing substances.

=== Viral replication cycle ===
==== Entry into cell ====
Chronic bee paralysis virus is transmitted to honey bees through a ubiquitous parasite common to honey bee hives, Varroa mites (Varroa destructor). Varroa mites are known to harbor many viruses for which honey bees are susceptible and permissive. The parasitic mites attach themselves to honey bees externally and feed off of the hemolymph of their hosts. This exchange of fluids between the parasitic mites and the hosts allows for CBPV particles to enter fluid transfer systems in the honey bee body. The mechanisms by which chronic bee paralysis virus gains entry into honey bee cells is currently unknown.

==== Replication ====
Like other positive sense single-stranded RNA viruses, Chronic bee paralysis virus replicates in the cytoplasm of honeybee cells. The first large (+) RNA fragment in the CBPV genome likely encodes for an RNA-dependent RNA polymerase, which makes many copies of viral RNA. After many copies of the genome have been produced, the honey bee host's cellular processes will translate the viral RNA into functional proteins which can cause propagation of the virus inside the host. The virus replicates at the highest levels in the head of the honeybee, reaching an average of 10^{7} copies of the virus in an infected worker bee head and as many as 10^{11} copies of the virus in an infected queen bee head. Chronic bee paralysis virus particles have been found to concentrate in two centers; in mushroom bodies which play a role in sensory processing, memory, and learning as well as in the central body, which plays a vital role in coordinating movement. Loss of flying ability in honey bees as a result of CBPV infection can be attributed to neuron destruction in the central body. Erratic behavior in infected bees may be a result of mushroom body neuron destruction.

==== Symptoms ====
Infected honeybees will begin to show symptoms of the illness within five days of infection, and the infection presents in two distinct ways, with Type I infection being the more common of the two infection types.

A Type I infected bee presents with a bloated abdomen due to a fluid-filled honey sac and weak or trembling wings. Type I infected honey bees tend to crawl on the ground or cluster near the entrance of the hive, as their weakened wings lead to an inability to fly.

A Type II infected honey bee presents with complete abdominal hair loss, causing it to appear black and greasy. These bees are still able to fly 2–3 days after symptoms begin to appear, but they lose their ability to fly shortly before succumbing to the disease.

A third type of infection that is a major contributor to the spread of the virus is an infection of CBPV in which the infected bee exhibits no symptoms of the illness. The infected bee does not present with any of the classic symptoms of the disease before death, and, as a result, is able to transmit the virus beyond its own hive.

==== Treatment ====
There is no known treatment for the disease currently.

== Testing ==
Chronic bee paralysis virus is classified as an inapparent infection because there are few tell-tale symptoms that appear before the infection has progressed to a fatal degree. As many honey bees can become infected and either show symptoms days after the initial point of infection or fail to show any symptoms throughout the entire course of the illness, CBPV can infect entire hives before the virus is detected. Despite the use of infectivity and serological tests, these testing methods are often inaccurate and difficult to reproduce with consistent results.

== Symbiotic relationships ==
Although Chronic bee paralysis virus mainly infects honey bees, the virus has also been found to replicate in two species of carnivorous ant, Camponotus vagus and Formica rufa. These carnivorous ants become infected with CBPV through two mechanisms: eating decomposing bees who harbor the virus or by independently collecting infected honeydew. While the virus does not cause any symptoms in the carnivorous ants, the commensal relationship between the virus and the ants allows the ants to serve as a reservoir for viral replication to occur.

Chronic bee paralysis virus is also similar to slow bee paralysis virus and acute bee paralysis virus. Though CBPV does not fall into the same family as the other two viruses, it bears similarities to the other viruses because it causes paralysis as the fatal symptom of the infection. Slow bee paralysis, in contrast to Chronic bee paralysis virus, causes paralysis of the front two pairs of legs on honey bees (Apis mellifera), silkworms (Bombyx mori), and bumble bees (Bombis spp.). This paralysis eventually causes death in the infected insects. Slow bee paralysis virus is transmitted to hives through Varroa destructor mite infestations. Because of the similarities between the two viruses, Chronic bee paralysis virus is suspected to have the same mode of transmission.

Chronic bee paralysis virus is also seen to interact with satellite viruses. The three short RNA segments of the viral genome are thought to be a satellite virus. Only in the presence of CBPV can the associated satellite virus proliferate.
