= Tapinoma ambiguum =

Scientific classification
- Domain: Eukaryota
- Kingdom: Animalia
- Phylum: Arthropoda
- Class: Insecta
- Order: Hymenoptera
- Family: Formicidae
- Subfamily: Dolichoderinae
- Genus: Tapinoma
- Species: T. ambiguum

Binomial name
- Tapinoma ambiguum Emery, 1925

Species of insect

Tapinoma ambiguum is a species of ant belonging to the family Formicidae.

It is native to Europe.
