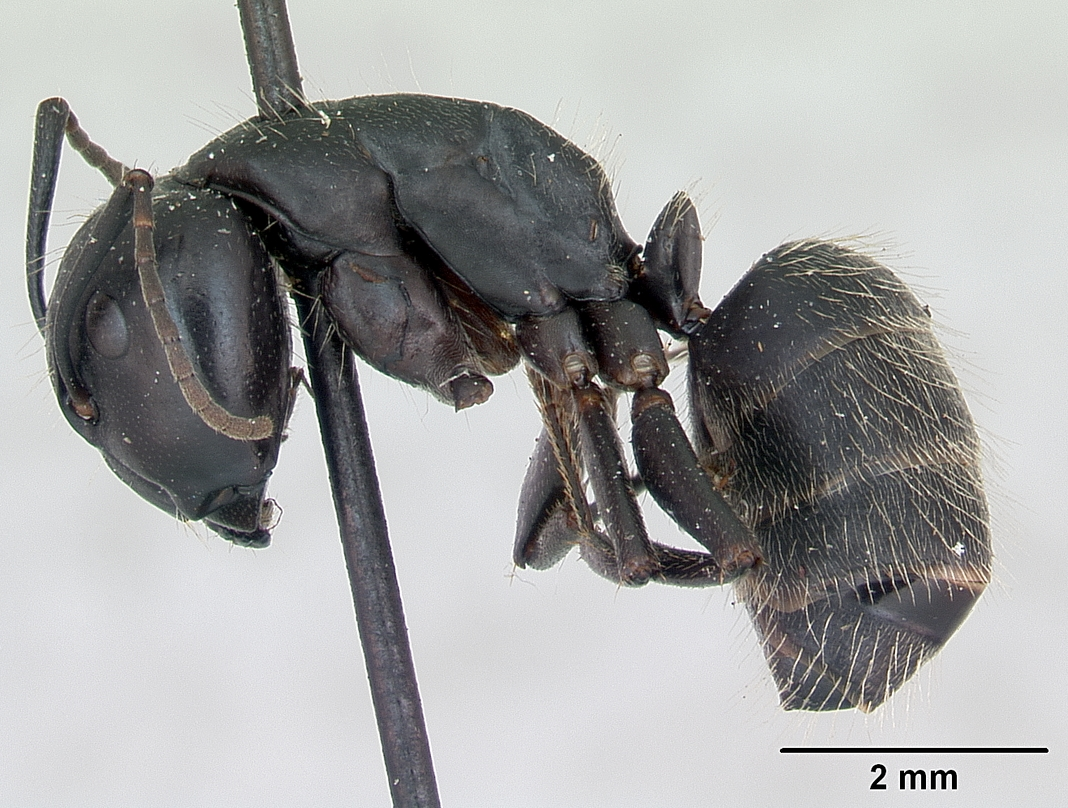

Scientific classification
- Kingdom: Animalia
- Phylum: Arthropoda
- Clade: Pancrustacea
- Class: Insecta
- Order: Hymenoptera
- Family: Formicidae
- Subfamily: Formicinae
- Genus: Camponotus
- Subgenus: Camponotus
- Species: C. vagus

Binomial name
- Camponotus vagus (Scopoli, 1763)

= Camponotus vagus =

Species of carpenter ant

Camponotus vagus is a species of large, black carpenter ant with a wide range that includes much of Europe, a large area of Asia, and part of Africa.

== Description ==
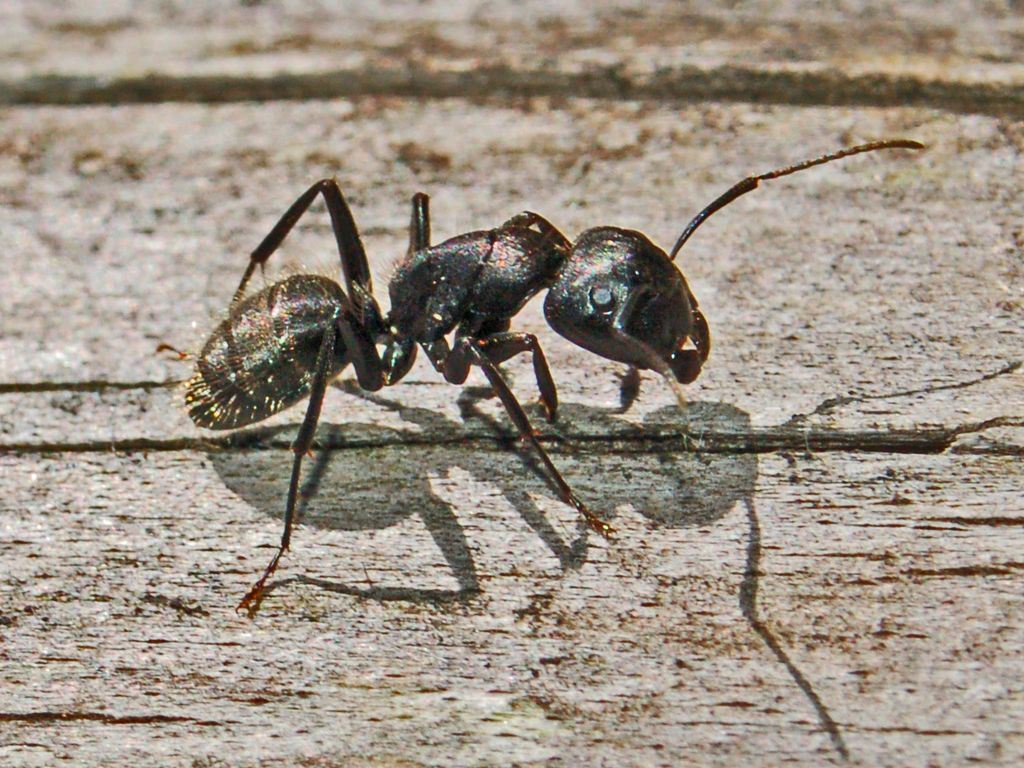
Camponotus vagus – Lateral view

Camponotus vagus is a relatively distinctive species that is easily identified by its large size, uniform black colour, and the long and dense body "hairs" on its exoskeleton. A eusocial insect, individuals have continuous allometric variation in size and morphology to facilitate task allocation and partitioning of work. Workers are 6–12 mm in length. The larger "major workers" act as guards for in defence of the colony and protect the smaller "minor workers" when the latter go foraging outside the nests. The powerful mandibles of the major workers are capable of decapitating smaller arthropods captured as food and dismembering smaller ants of other species.

== Diet ==
C. vagus is known to be both carnivorous and aphidicolous (living in a mutualistic relationship with aphids and feeding upon the honeydew these smaller insects release from the terminations of their alimentary canals).

== Range ==
This species is especially prevalent in central Europe but has an overall range from southern Scandinavia to north-western Africa and from Portugal to Altai, Mongolia. Evidence of this species in northern Europe is scattered and isolated; Southwards it is more common. In Norway, an extreme area of its range, is a rare and often overlooked species. There are few records of C. vagus in Sweden and Finland, and many of these are outdated.

== Habitat ==
The colonies are commonly found in dry habitats, especially open forests and forest edges. C. vagus most typically builds its nests in dead wood, but colonies can also be founded under stones. An average colony has 1,000 to 4,000 workers, but larger colonies contain up to 10,000 individuals.

== Common names ==
C. vagus, like all ants in genus Camponotus, may be referred to by the English language common name "carpenter ant" but it is known by other names across its range. In the Netherlands, for example, this species is known in Dutch as zwarte reuzenmier, i.e. "black giant ant".

== Bee paralysis virus ==
In 2008, the Chronic bee paralysis virus (CBPV) was reported for the first time in this species and another species of ant, Formica rufa. CPPV affects bees, ants, and mites.

== Taxonomic history ==
vagus. Formica vaga Scopoli, 1763: 312 (w.) AUSTRIA. Latreille, 1802c: 96 (w.q.m.). Hauschteck, 1961: 221 (k.). Combination in Camponotus: Roger, 1863b: 1; in C. (Camponotus): Forel, 1914a: 266. [Misspelled as vagans: Emery, 1891b: 20.] Subspecies of herculeanus: Emery, 1896d: 372; Emery, 1908a: 185; Bondroit, 1910: 488. Revived status as species: Ruzsky, 1905b: 241; Forel, 1915d: 68; Emery, 1916b: 225; Emery, 1920b: 255; Finzi, 1924a: 14; Karavaiev, 1927c: 275; Finzi, 1930d: 317; Santschi, 1931a: 11; Stitz, 1939: 246. See also: Yasumatsu & Brown, 1951: 31; Arnol'di & Dlussky, 1978: 551; Atanassov & Dlussky, 1992: 214. Senior synonym of pubescens: Olivier, 1792: 492; Emery, 1891b: 20; Forel, 1892i: 306; of fuscoptera: Latreille, 1802c: 96; of kodorica: Radchenko, 1997a: 558. Current subspecies: nominal plus ifranensis.

As just noted, Camponotus vagus ifranensis (Cagniant, 1987) is recognized as a subspecies. Previously identified subspecies Camponotus vagus kodoricus (Forel, 1913) and Camponotus vagus vagus (Scopoli, 1763) are no longer recognized.
