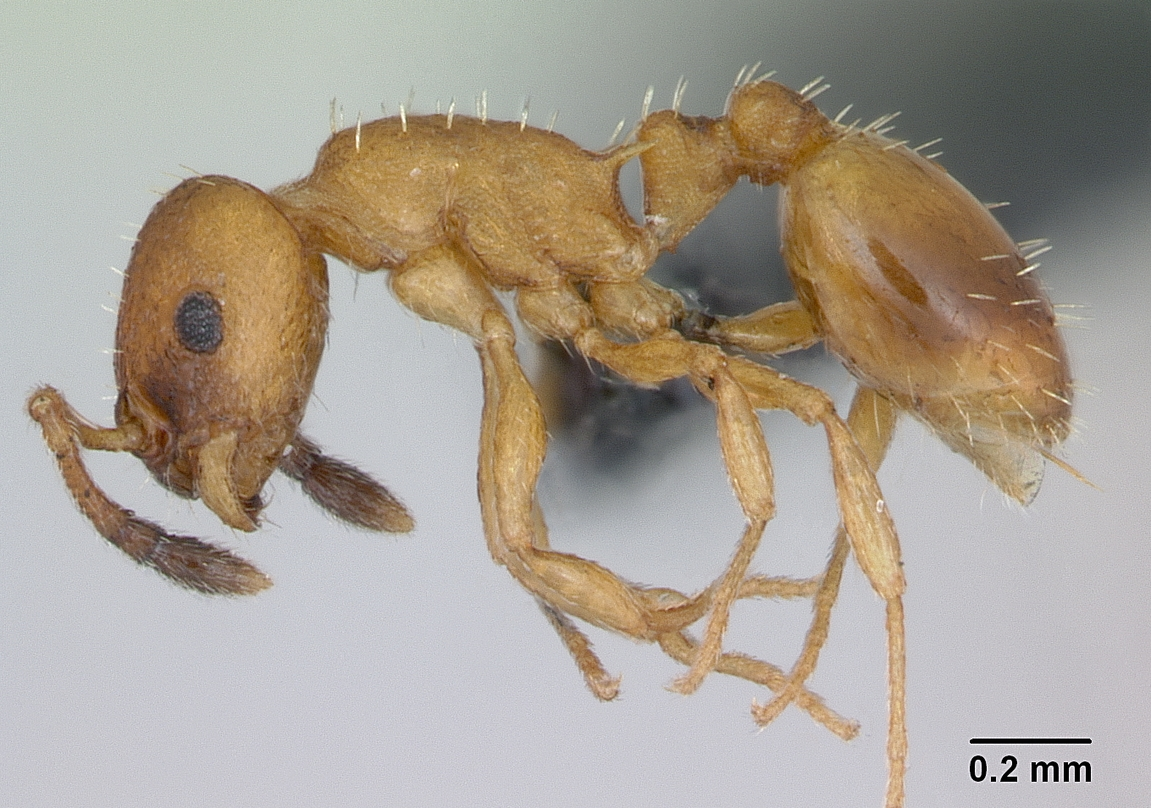

Scientific classification
- Domain: Eukaryota
- Kingdom: Animalia
- Phylum: Arthropoda
- Class: Insecta
- Order: Hymenoptera
- Family: Formicidae
- Subfamily: Myrmicinae
- Genus: Temnothorax
- Species: T. interruptus

Binomial name
- Temnothorax interruptus (Schenck, 1852)

= Temnothorax interruptus =

Species of insect

Temnothorax interruptus is a species of ant belonging to the family Formicidae.

Synonyms:

- Temnothorax interruptus interruptus (Schenck, 1852)
- Leptothorax interruptus (Schenck, 1852)
- Leptothorax interruptus interruptus (Schenck, 1852)
- Leptothorax knipovitschi (misspelling)
- Leptothorax knipovitshi Karavaiev, 1916
- Temnothorax knipovitshi (Karavaiev, 1916)
