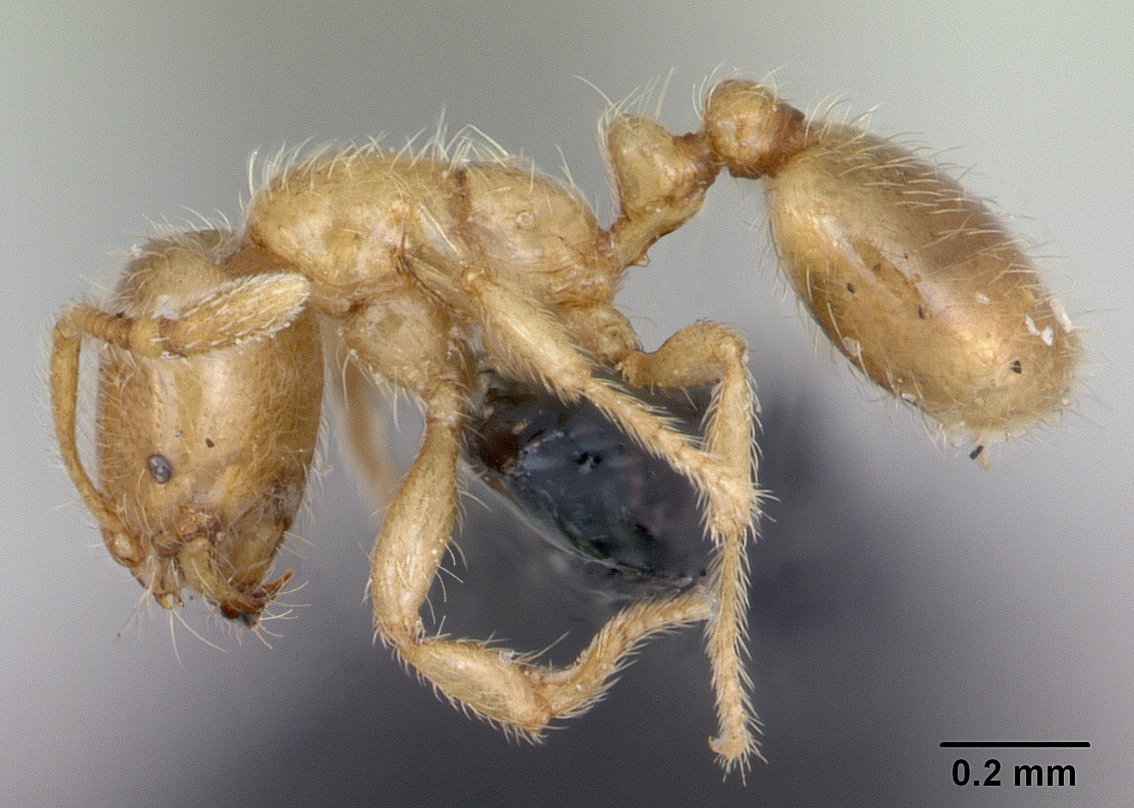
- Solenopsis fugax worker

Scientific classification
- Kingdom: Animalia
- Phylum: Arthropoda
- Class: Insecta
- Order: Hymenoptera
- Family: Formicidae
- Subfamily: Myrmicinae
- Genus: Solenopsis
- Species: S. fugax

Binomial name
- Solenopsis fugax Latreille, 1798[1]

= Solenopsis fugax =

Species of ant

Solenopsis fugax is a myrmicine ant of the genus Solenopsis.

It is the only member of its genus to be native to the British Isles, and although rare, it has been taken by Horace Donisthorpe in a number of localities on England's southern coast, including Sandown and Shanklin on the Isle of Wight, and also in the southwesterly region of Lyme Regis. It can be found throughout Europe and Central Asia some parts of South West Asia and the southern part of Western Siberia.

The species is a thief ant and usually has its nest near another species, stealing food by entering the foreign colony through minute tunnels dug from their own nest.

== Relations ==
Solenopsis fugax is a close relative of some tropical species from the genus Solenopsis; some of its many close relatives are S. geminata, S. molesta and S. invicta. The key difference is that the more temperately adapted Solenopsis fugax hibernates in the winter to avoid the harsh cold and lack of food found in these temperate environments. S. fugax is also separated by its lighter colour.
