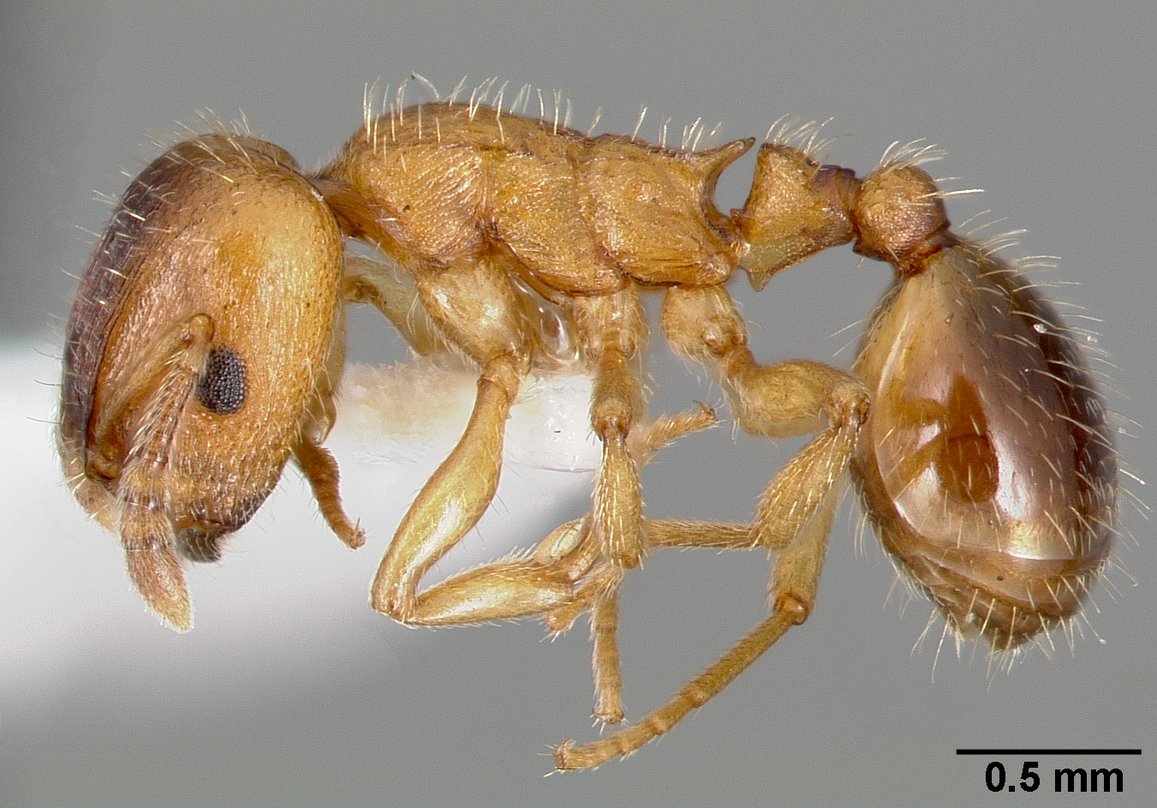
- Harpagoxenus canadensis worker

Scientific classification
- Kingdom: Animalia
- Phylum: Arthropoda
- Class: Insecta
- Order: Hymenoptera
- Family: Formicidae
- Subfamily: Myrmicinae
- Tribe: Crematogastrini
- Genus: Harpagoxenus; Forel, 1893

Type species
- Myrmica sublaevis Nylander, 1849

Diversity
- 3 species

Synonyms
- Tomognathus Mayr, 1861

= Harpagoxenus =

Genus of ants

Harpagoxenus is a genus of ants in the subfamily Myrmicinae. Found in the Palaearctic and Nearctic ecozones of the world, Harpagoxenus was first established as Tomognathus by Mayr (1861) to house the species Myrmica sublaevis (now Harpagoxenus sublaevis). However, the name had already been used (homonym) for a genus of fish, and was replaced with its current name by Forel (1893).

== Species ==
- Harpagoxenus canadensis Smith, 1939
- Harpagoxenus sublaevis (Nylander, 1849)
- Harpagoxenus zaisanicus Pisarski, 1963
