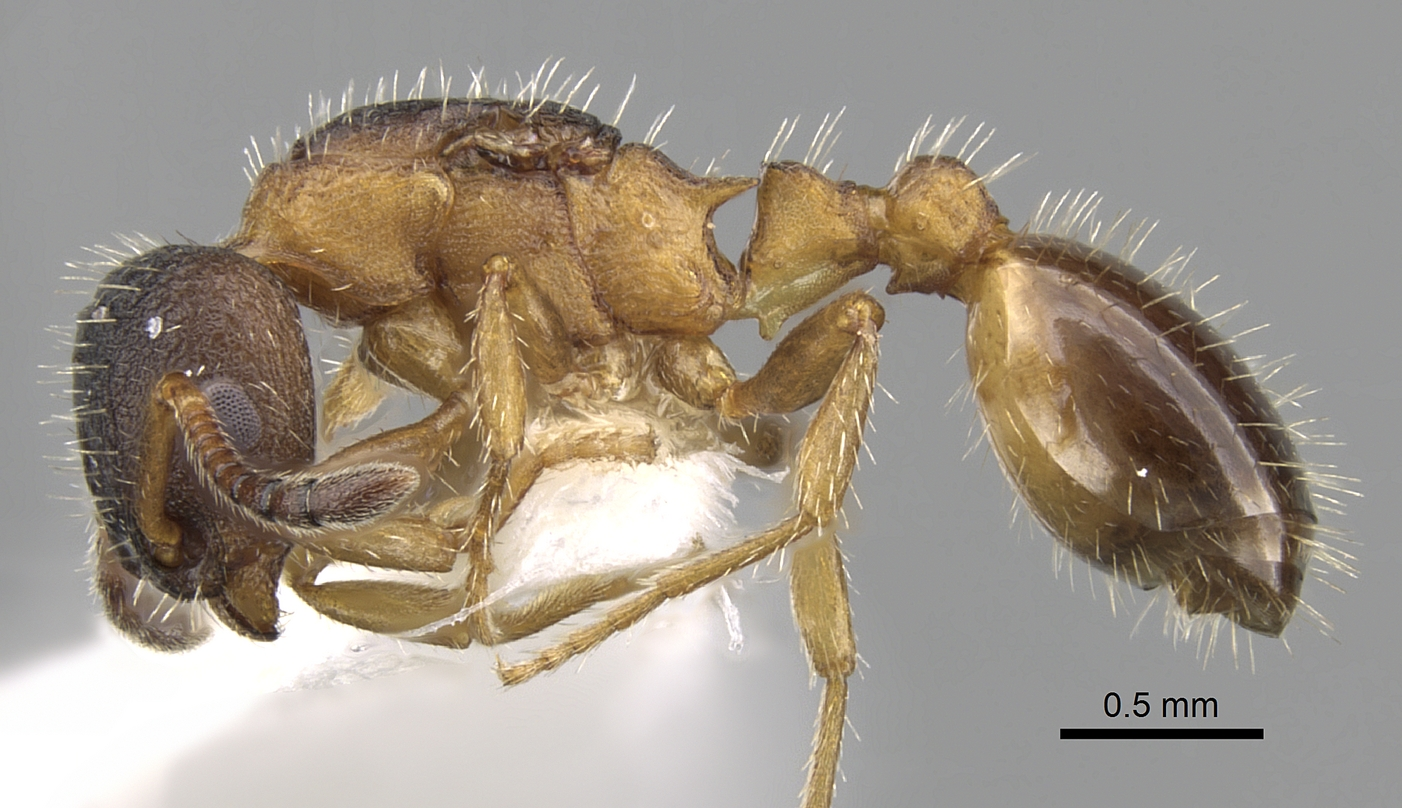
- Leptothorax goesswaldi worker

Conservation status
- Vulnerable (IUCN 2.3)

Scientific classification
- Kingdom: Animalia
- Phylum: Arthropoda
- Class: Insecta
- Order: Hymenoptera
- Family: Formicidae
- Subfamily: Myrmicinae
- Genus: Leptothorax
- Species: L. goesswaldi

Binomial name
- Leptothorax goesswaldi Kutter, 1967

= Leptothorax goesswaldi =

Species of ant

Leptothorax goesswaldi is a species of ant in the genus Leptothorax. It is found in France and Switzerland.
