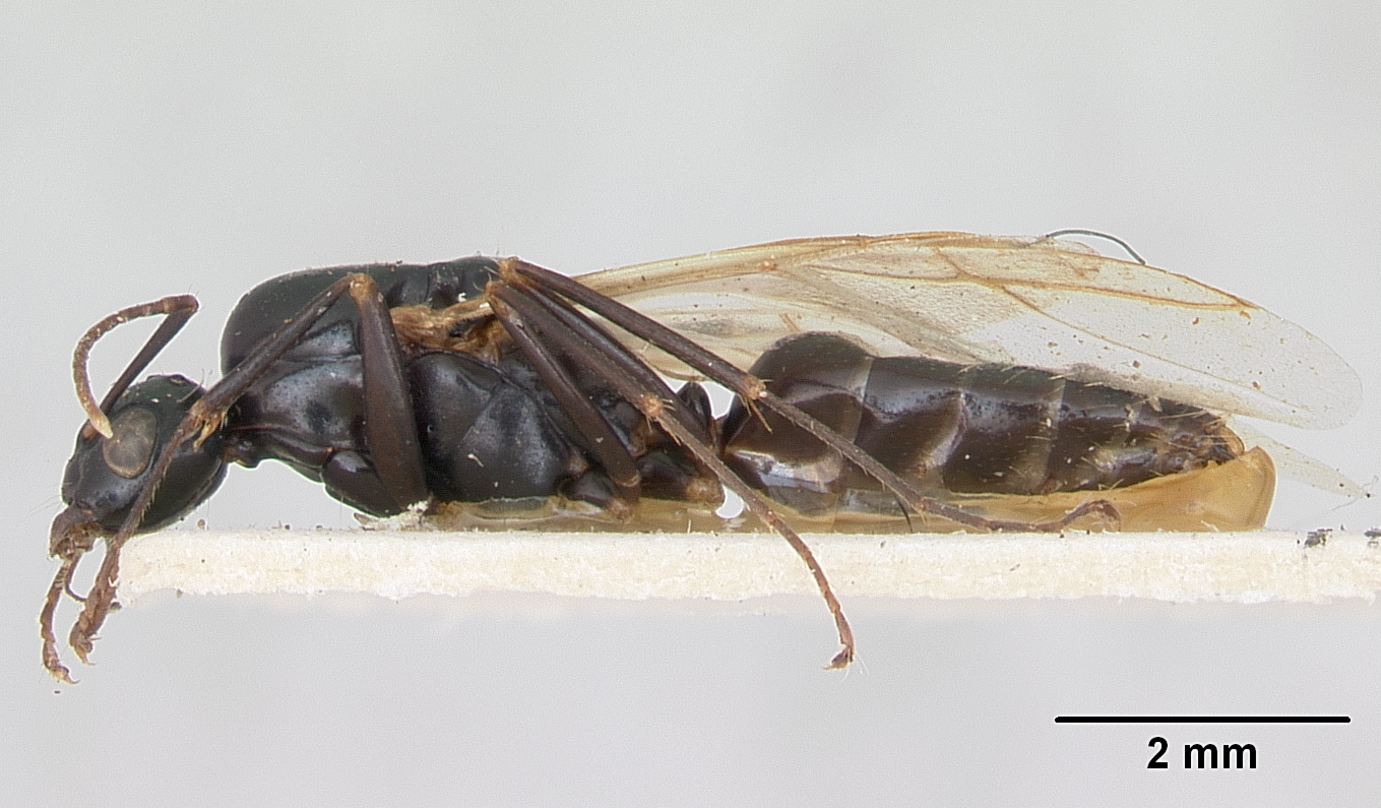

Scientific classification
- Domain: Eukaryota
- Kingdom: Animalia
- Phylum: Arthropoda
- Class: Insecta
- Order: Hymenoptera
- Family: Formicidae
- Subfamily: Formicinae
- Genus: Camponotus
- Subgenus: Myrmentoma
- Species: C. fallax

Binomial name
- Camponotus fallax (Nylander, 1856)

= Camponotus fallax =

Species of insect

Camponotus fallax is a species of carpenter ant native to Europe, Asia, northern Africa, and possibly North America and South Korea.

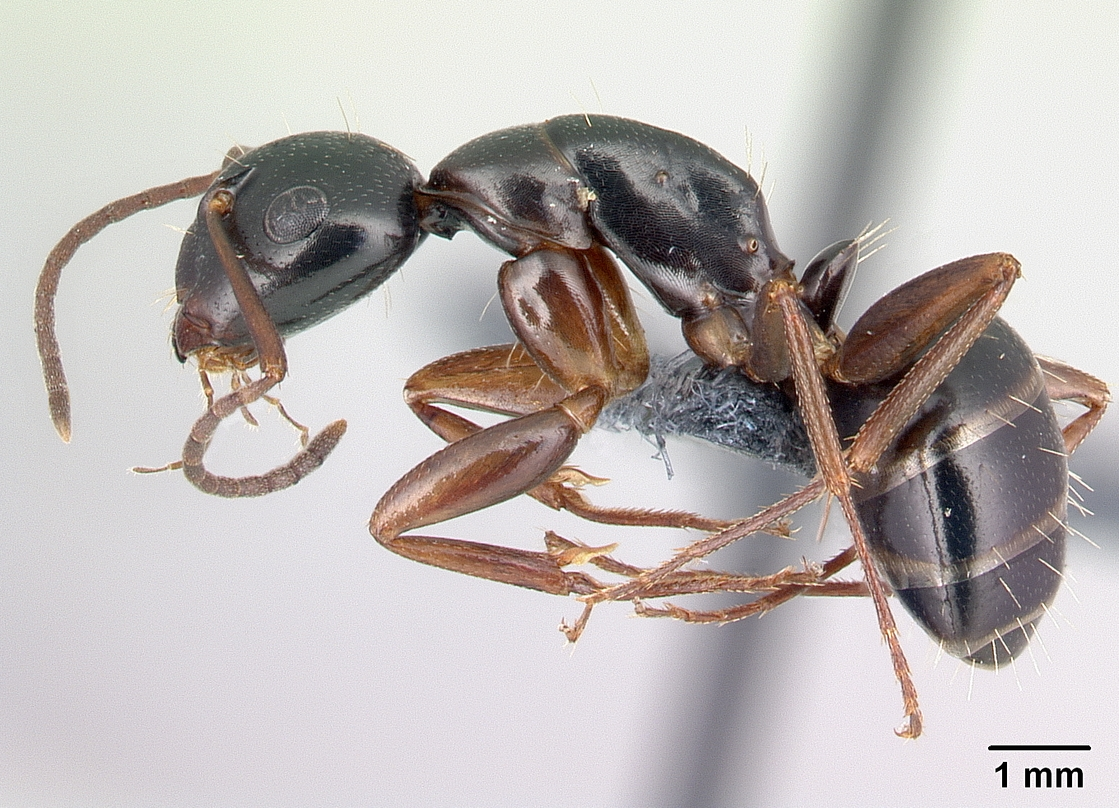
antweb.org specimen
