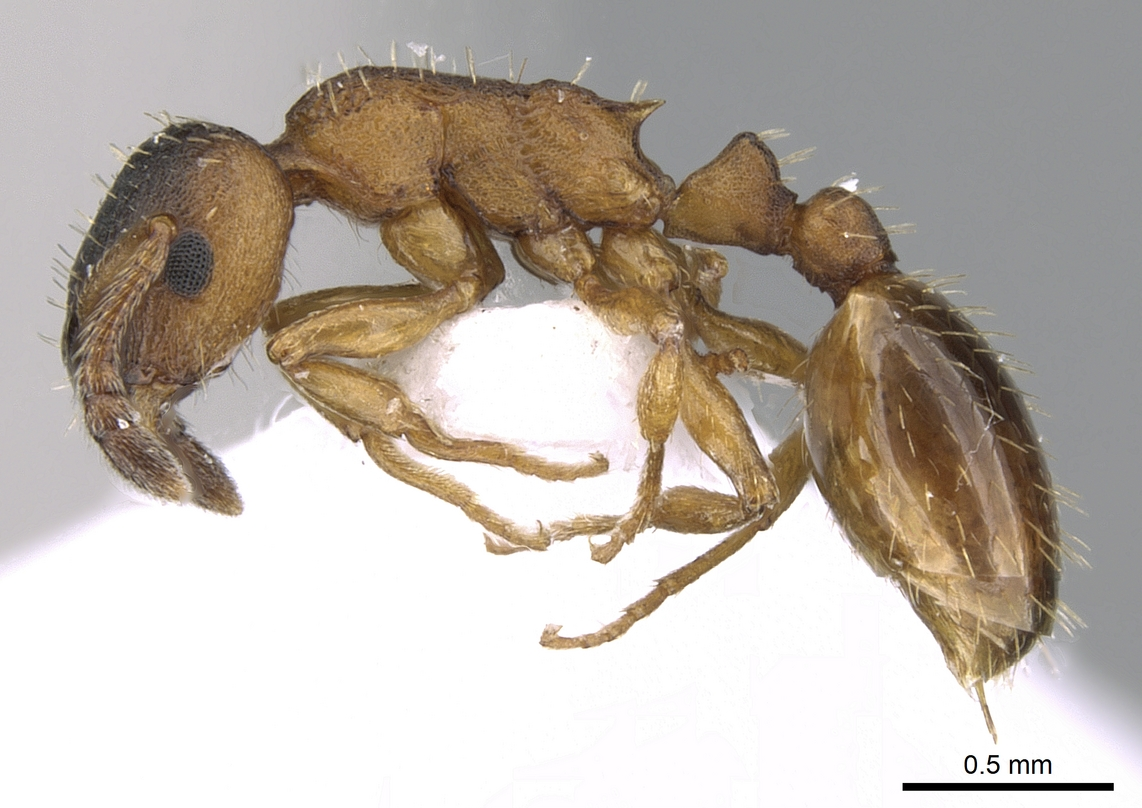

Scientific classification
- Domain: Eukaryota
- Kingdom: Animalia
- Phylum: Arthropoda
- Class: Insecta
- Order: Hymenoptera
- Family: Formicidae
- Subfamily: Myrmicinae
- Genus: Leptothorax
- Species: L. gredleri

Binomial name
- Leptothorax gredleri Mayr, 1855

= Leptothorax gredleri =

Species of insect

Leptothorax gredleri is a species of ant belonging to the family Formicidae.

It is native to Europe.
