= Lasius bicornis =

Scientific classification
- Domain: Eukaryota
- Kingdom: Animalia
- Phylum: Arthropoda
- Class: Insecta
- Order: Hymenoptera
- Family: Formicidae
- Subfamily: Formicinae
- Genus: Lasius
- Species: L. bicornis

Binomial name
- Lasius bicornis (Förster, 1850)

Species of insect

Lasius bicornis is a species of ant belonging to the family Formicidae.

It is native to Europe.
