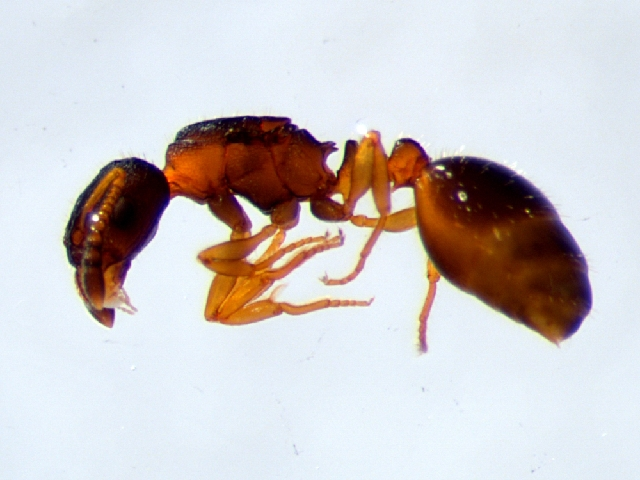

Conservation status
- Vulnerable (IUCN 2.3)

Scientific classification
- Kingdom: Animalia
- Phylum: Arthropoda
- Class: Insecta
- Order: Hymenoptera
- Family: Formicidae
- Subfamily: Myrmicinae
- Genus: Leptothorax
- Species: L. kutteri

Binomial name
- Leptothorax kutteri Buschinger, 1966

= Leptothorax kutteri =

Species of ant

Leptothorax kutteri is a species of ant in the genus Leptothorax. It is endemic to Europe, Germany, Sweden, and Switzerland.
