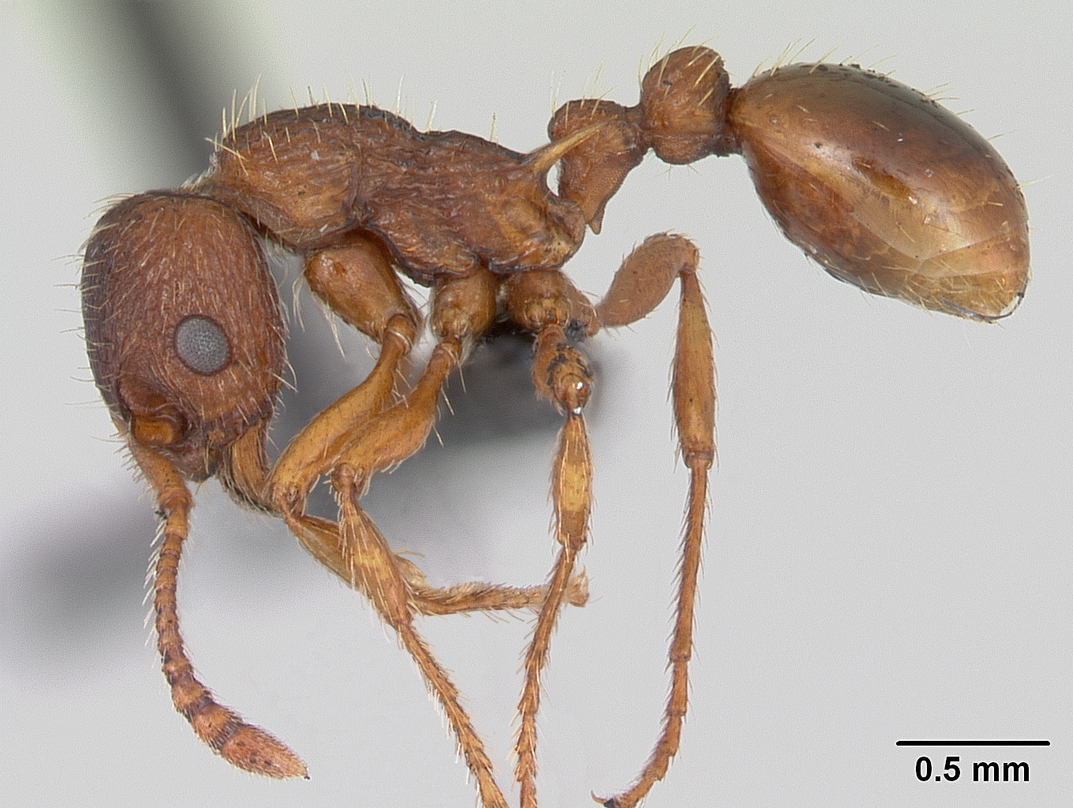

Scientific classification
- Kingdom: Animalia
- Phylum: Arthropoda
- Clade: Pancrustacea
- Class: Insecta
- Order: Hymenoptera
- Family: Formicidae
- Subfamily: Myrmicinae
- Genus: Myrmica
- Species: M. specioides

Binomial name
- Myrmica specioides Bondroit 1918

= Myrmica specioides =

Species of ant

Myrmica specioides is a species of ant of the genus Myrmica.
