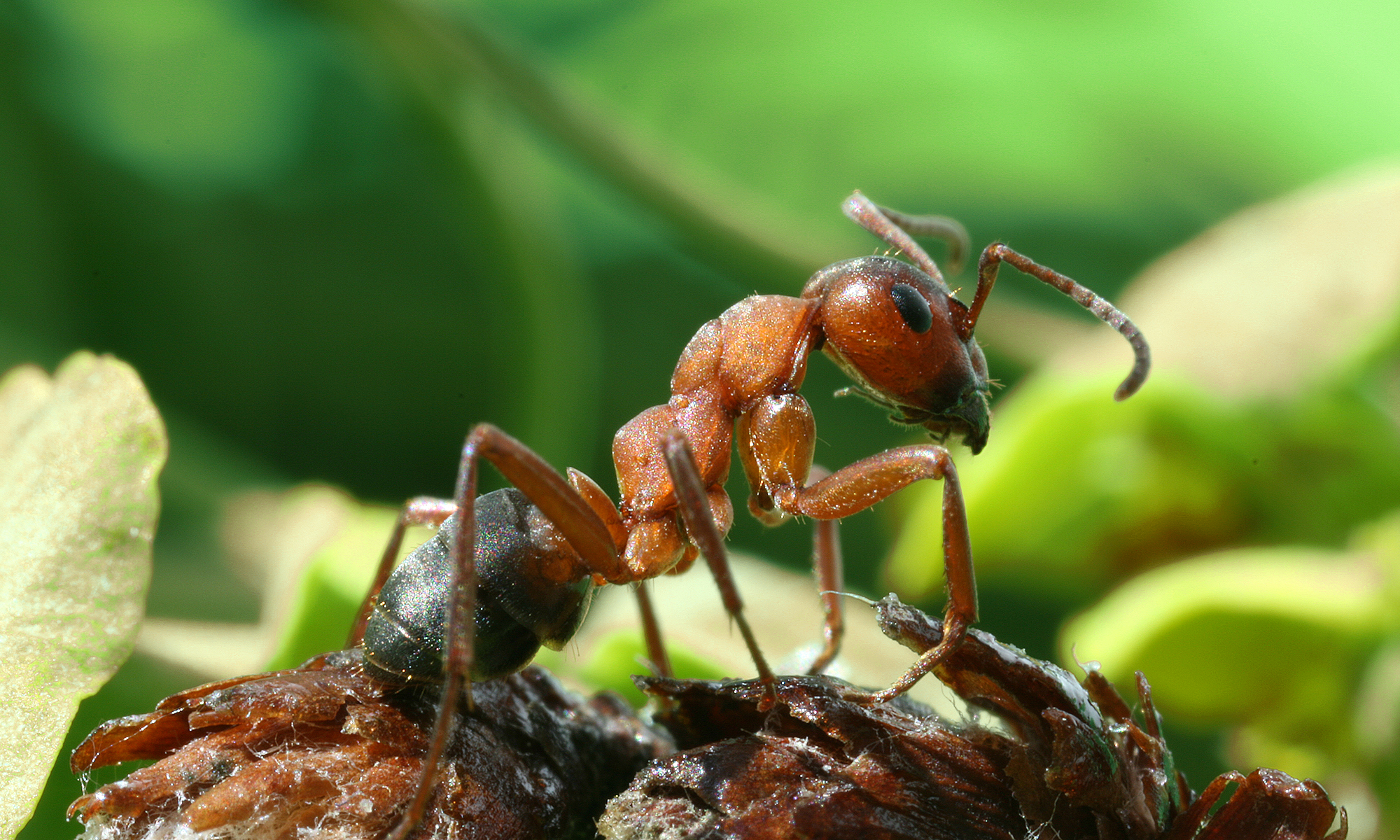
- Formica rufa worker

Conservation status
- Near Threatened (IUCN 3.1)

Scientific classification
- Kingdom: Animalia
- Phylum: Arthropoda
- Clade: Pancrustacea
- Class: Insecta
- Order: Hymenoptera
- Family: Formicidae
- Subfamily: Formicinae
- Genus: Formica
- Species: F. rufa

Binomial name
- Formica rufa Linnaeus, 1761

= Formica rufa =

Species of ant

Formica rufa, also known as the red wood ant, southern wood ant, or horse ant, is a boreal member of the Formica rufa group of ants, and is the type species for that group, being described by Linnaeus. It is native to Eurasia, with a recorded distribution stretching from the middle of Scandinavia to northern Iberia and Anatolia, and from Great Britain to Lake Baikal, with unconfirmed reports of it in the Russian Far East. There are claims that it can be found in North America, but this is not confirmed in specialised literature: no recent publication where North American wood ants are listed mentions it as present and records from North America are listed as dubious or unconfirmed in a record compilation. The workers' heads and thoraces are colored red and the abdomen brownish-black, usually with dark patches on the head and promesonotum, although some individuals may be more uniformly reddish and even have some red on the part of the gaster facing the body. In order to separate them from closely related species, specimens needs to be inspected under magnification, where difference in hairiness is among the telling characteristics, with Formica rufa being hairier than, for example, Formica polyctena but less hairy than Formica lugubris. Workers are polymorphic, measuring 4.5–9 mm in length. They have large mandibles and, like many other ant species, are able to spray formic acid from their abdomens as a defence. Formic acid was first extracted in 1671 by the English naturalist John Ray, by distilling a large number of crushed ants of this species. Adult wood ants primarily feed on honeydew from aphids. Some F. rufa colonies are large networks of connected nests with multiple queens, while others have a single queen.

== Description ==
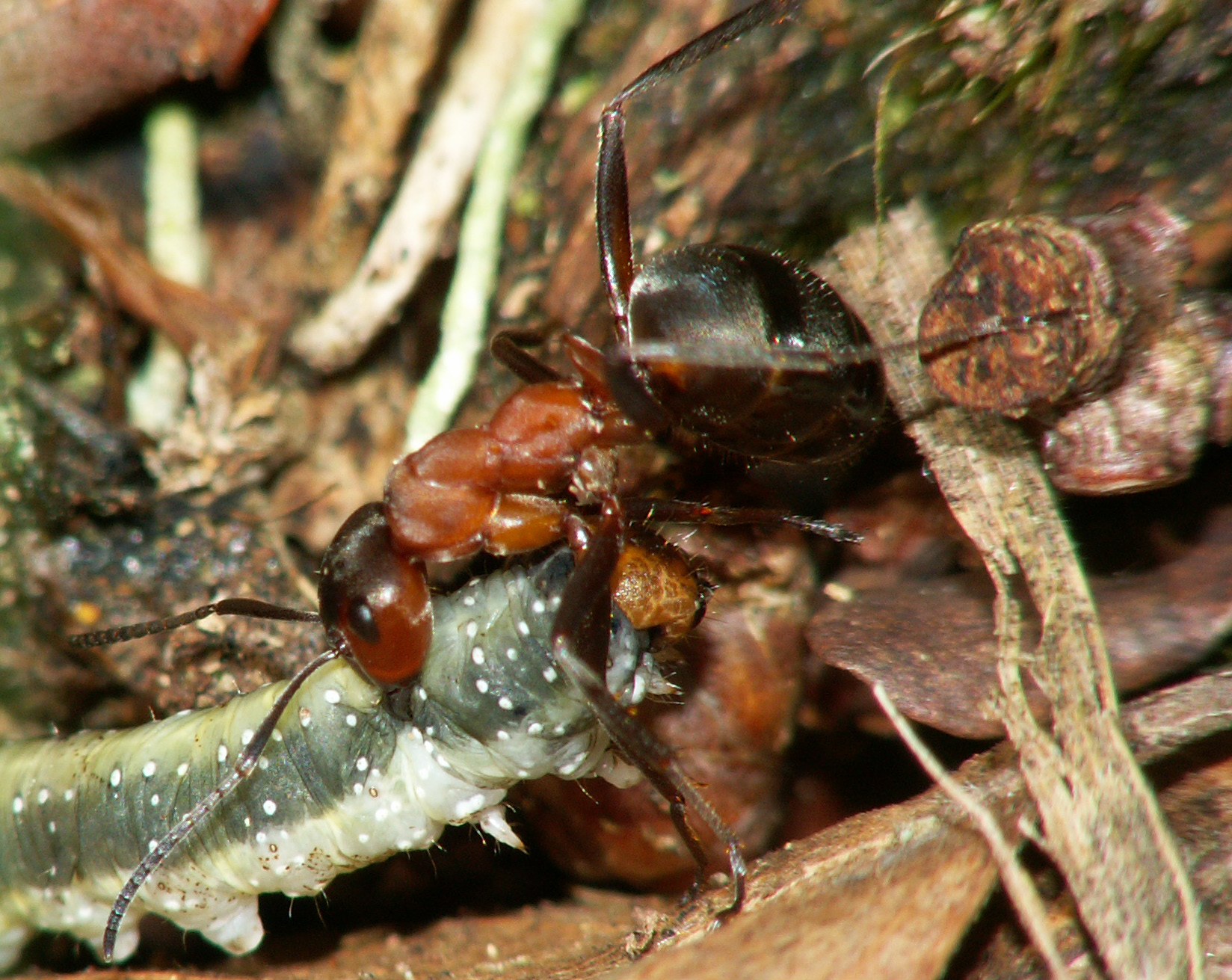
A caterpillar being bitten by F. rufa

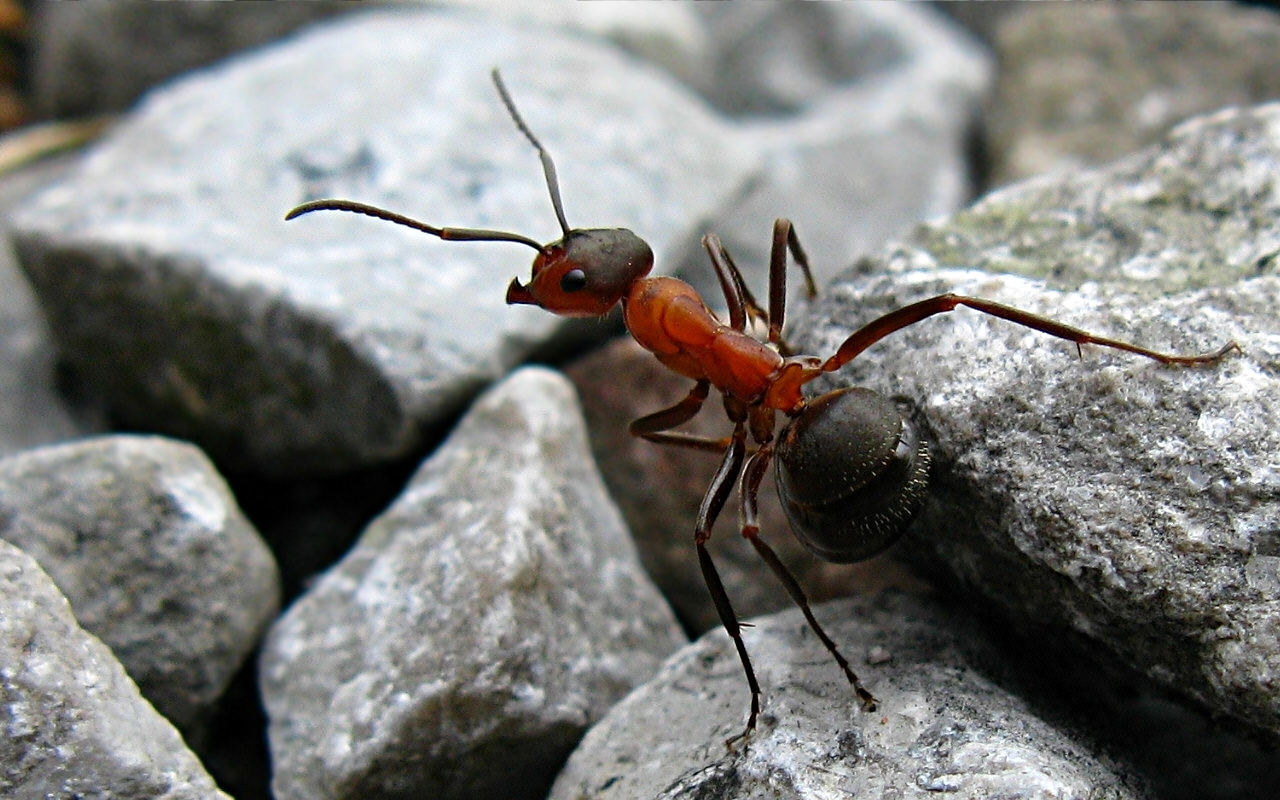
Patrolling F. rufa

Nests of these ants are large, conspicuous, dome-shaped mounds of grass, twigs, or conifer needles, often built against a rotting stump and usually situated in woodland clearings where the sun's rays can reach them. Large colonies may have 100,000 to 400,000 workers and 100 queens. F. rufa is highly polygynous and often readopts postnuptial queens from its own mother colony, leading to old, multichamber nests that may contain well over 100 egg-producing females. These colonies can be several metres in height and diameter. F. rufa is aggressively territorial, and often attacks and removes other ant species from the area. Nuptial flights take place during the springtime and are often marked by savage battles between neighbouring colonies as territorial boundaries are re-established. New nests are established by budding from existing nests in the spring, or by temporary social parasitism, the hosts being species of the F. fusca group, notably F. fusca and F. lemani, although incipient F. rufa colonies have also been recorded from nests of F. glebaria and F. cunicularia. An F. rufa queen ousts the nest's existing queen and lays eggs of her own, and the existing workers care for her offspring until those offspring take over the nest.

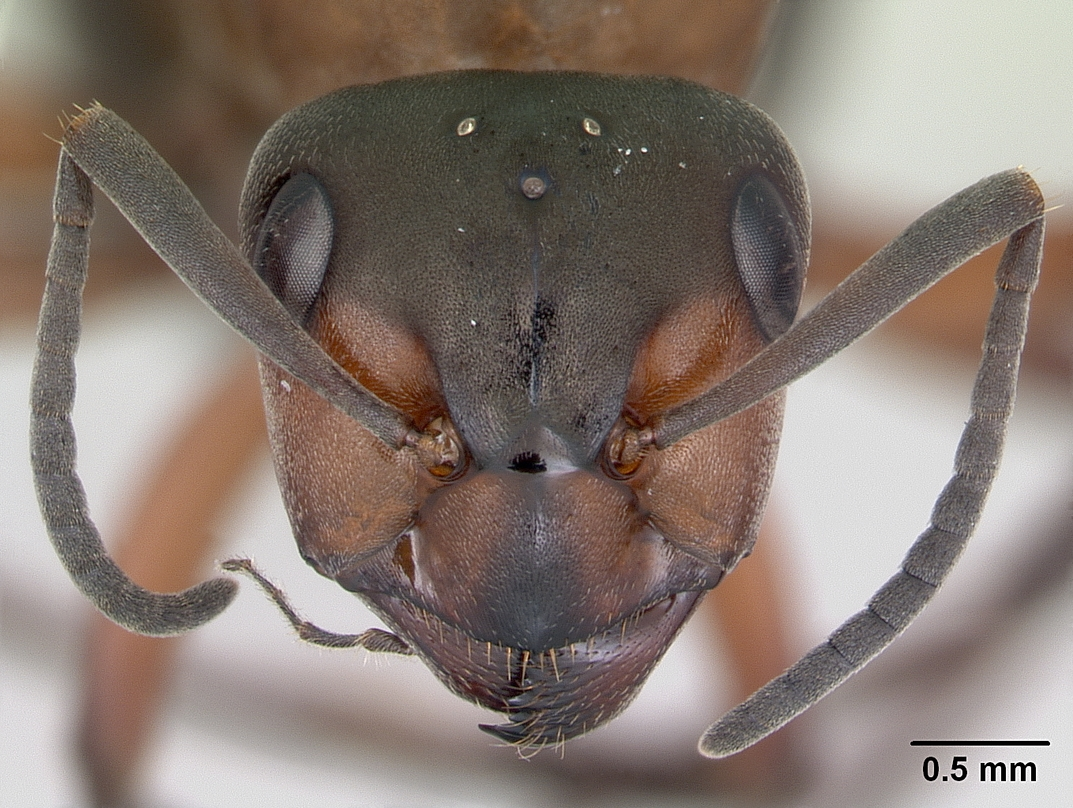
Detail of the head. Picture from antweb.org casent0173863

== Diet ==
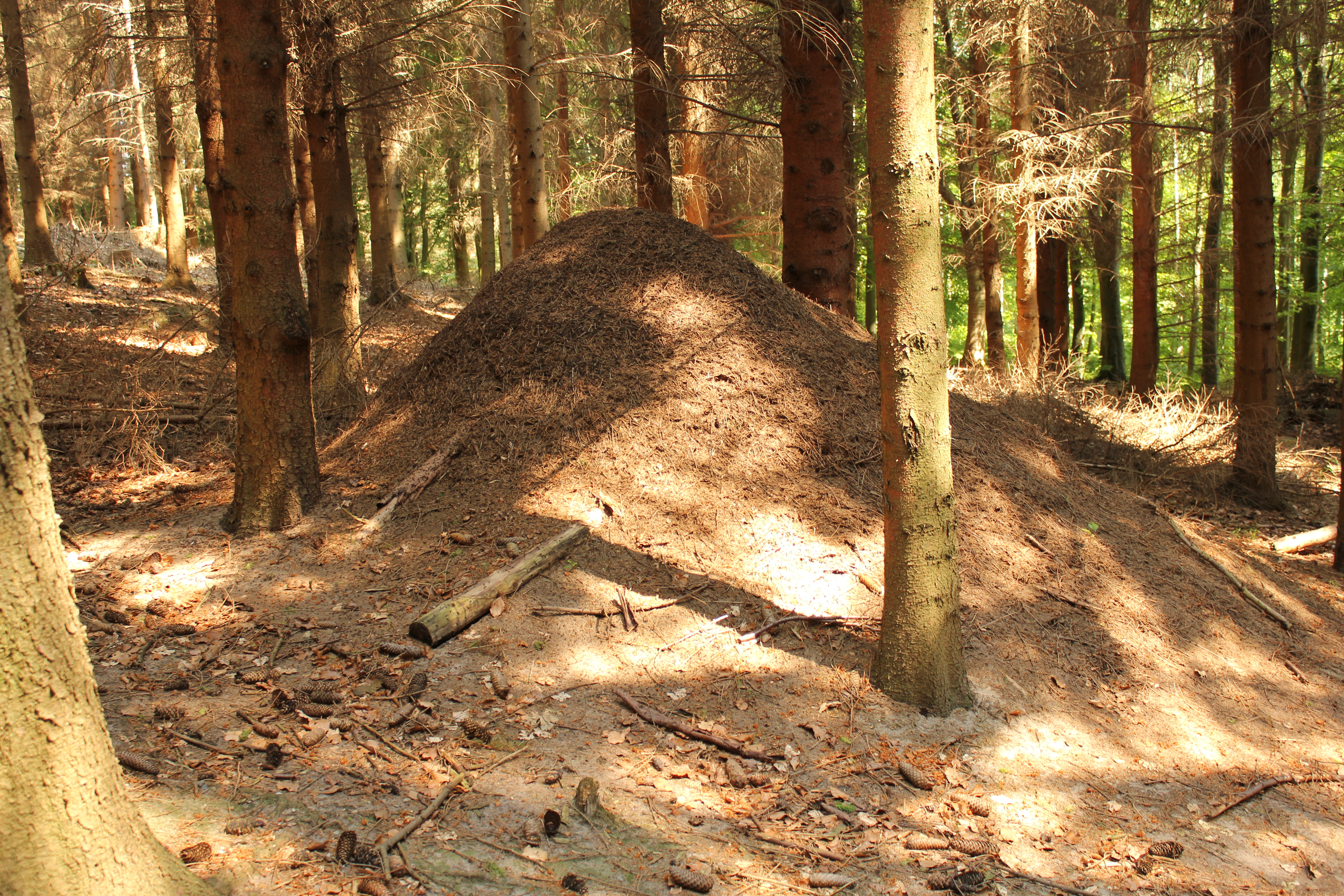
F. rufa nest

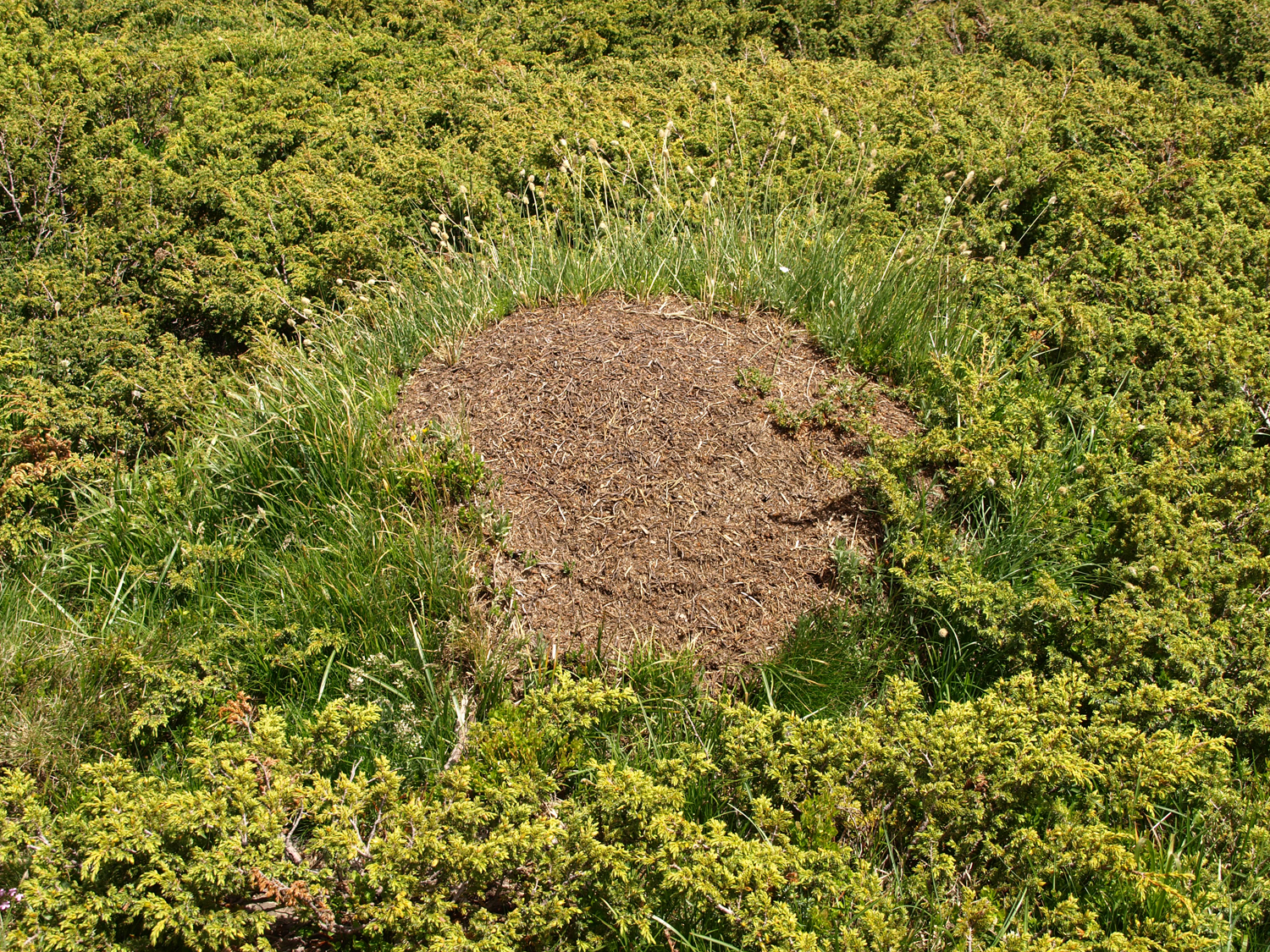
F. rufa nest in meadow near Rila, Bulgaria

These ants' primary diet is aphid honeydew, but they also prey on invertebrates such as insects and arachnids; they are voracious scavengers. Foraging trails may extend 100 m (330 ft). Larger workers have been observed to forage farther away from the nest. F. rufa is commonly used in forestry and is introduced into an area as a form of pest management.

== Behavior ==
=== Nursing ===
Worker ants in F. rufa have been observed to practice parental care or perform cocoon nursing. A worker ant goes through a sensitive phase, where it becomes accustomed to a chemical stimulus emitted by the cocoon. The sensitive phase occurs at an early and specific period. An experiment was conducted by Moli et al. to test how worker ants react to different types of cocoon: homospecific and heterospecific cocoons. If the worker ant is brought up in the absence of cocoons, it will show neither recognition nor nursing behaviour, and both types of cocoons will be opened up by the workers and devoured for nutrients. When accustomed to only the homospecific cocoons, the workers collect both types of cocoons, but only place and protect the homospecific cocoons, while the heterospecific cocoons are neglected, abandoned in the nest and eaten. Lastly, if heterospecific cocoons are injected with extract from the homospecific cocoons, the workers tend to both types of cocoons equally. This demonstrates that a chemical stimulus from the cocoons seems to be of paramount importance in prompting adoption behaviour in worker ants. However, the specific chemical or stimulus has not been identified.

=== Foraging behaviour ===
The foraging behaviour of wood ants varies depending on the environment. They have been shown to tend and harvest aphids as well as prey on and compete with other predators for food resources. They tend to prey on the most abundant members of the community, whether in tree canopies or forest foliage. Wood ants seem to favour prey living in local canopies near their nest. However, when food resources dwindle, they seek other trees further from the nest and explore more trees instead of the forest floor. This makes foraging for food significantly less efficient, but the rest of the nest does not help the foraging ants.

=== Kin behaviour ===
Ants recognise their nestmates through chemical signals. Failure to recognise each other causes the integrity of the colony to decay. Wood ants have shown aggressive behaviour toward their own species in certain situations. Intraspecific competition usually occurs early in the spring between workers of competing nests. This aggression may be linked to the protection of territory and trails. Based on skirmishes and trail formation of wood ants, the territory surrounding each nest differs between seasons. Permanent foraging trails are reinforced each season, and, if an ant from an alien species crossed it, hostile activity occurs. Most likely, the territory changes based on foraging patterns are influenced by seasonal changes.

Accumulation of heavy metals in the environment also alters aggression levels. This could be due to a variety of factors, such as changes in physiological effect or changes in resource levels. The ants in these territories tend to be less productive and efficient. Increased resource competition would be expected to increase level of aggression, but this is not the case.

=== Raiding ===
Wood ants, particularly those in the Formica species, perform organised and planned attacks on colonies of other ants and other insects. These planned attacks are motivated by territory expansion, resource acquisition, and brood capture. Raids are performed at certain times of the year, when resources may need restocking, and during the day, when ants are most active. Organised and cooperative strategies for raiding are more specific tactics used by the F. polyctena species. However, raiding is still an integral behaviour of the F. rufa group. Scouts will investigate neighbouring nests to raid, marking their targets using pheromones. Wood ants are also capable of counterattack and defensive retaliation. Strong defensive measures include guarding entrances to tunnels and having routine patrols of the areas to watch neighbouring nests. Some wood ant species, such as F. sanguinea, will raid brood, which is then integrated into their colony as workers. This behaviour enables the colony to bolster its workforce without expending energy on raising its brood. The captured brood matures and functions within the raiding colony, helping with foraging and nest maintenance tasks.

Raiding has significant evolutionary and ecological implications. This behaviour can establish dominance hierarchies among colonies and influence the structure of ant communities. Raiding also contributes to the success of dominant species, by providing access to resources that might otherwise be difficult to obtain. This behaviour also reflects the ants’ ability to adapt their foraging strategies to varying environmental conditions. Wood ants can also alter the distribution of resources in the ecosystem by dominating key food sources.

=== Resin use ===
Wood ants intently collect resins from coniferous trees and incorporate them into their nests for various uses. Resin provides structural soundness and predator defense for their nests and antimicrobial, antifungal, and pathogen defense when in conjunction with formic acid from their venom gland.

By leveraging the antimicrobial properties of the resin, wood ants are able to adequately ensure and sustain the health of their colonies. Wood ant nests are vulnerable to rapidly spreading microbial loads, due to the dense population and organic debris accumulation within large, complex structures. Terpenes and phenolic acids found in coniferous tree resins provide antimicrobial defense and inhibit the growth of pathogens within the nests when mixed with the ants' formic acid. Nests that have been fortified by resin have significantly less microbial diversity when compared to nests without resin. By managing their environment, wood ants protect the health of their colonies, with the direct advantages of protecting the queen and developing brood with decreased pathogen exposure.

Besides antifungal and microbial defense, resin provides valuable structural integrity to the nest and a protective barrier against potential intruders and predators. Wood ant nests are vulnerable to numerous external threats, as they are often large, complex, and above ground. By binding the resin to other organic materials, the nest is provided with cohesive building material, making the nest less prone to collapse. Incorporating resin also provides nests with waterproofing and weather resistance, another way to prevent fungal growth. The stickiness and occasional toxicity of the resin aid in providing a protective barrier against small arthropods, including mites, that may attack the nest. Chemically, the resin provides camouflage and deters intruders that may use chemical cues to locate nests.

== Colony structure ==
=== Polygyny ===
Polygyny in wood ants (Formica genus) is a colony social structure that contains multiple reproducing queens. Polygyny may have evolved to enhance colony survival in unstable environments, as it allows wood ants to disperse across larger areas by establishing interconnected nests with several queens. This differs from the more commonly observed monogynous social structure of only one reproducing queen within a colony. This behaviour can lead to significant ecological, evolutionary, and colony-level consequences.

In a monogynous colony, a new queen will typically leave its nest by flight to find and establish a new nest away from the old one. In a polygynous colony, the new queen will establish its nest nearby, with worker ants helping to connect and create cooperative, large colonies. Polygyny allows for higher genetic diversity within the colony, making the colony less susceptible to pathogens and infections. These polygynous colonies have a more complex social hierarchy and can be more successful in certain ecological contexts because of the combined reproductive efforts of several queens.

Wood ant colonies exhibit reduced levels of relatedness between workers through polygyny, which can have negative and positive implications. One negative implication is that cooperation between ants within a colony can be reduced. However, the sheer scale of resources available to polygynous colonies mitigates this reduced level of cooperation. Another positive implication is that colonies grow faster due to multiple queens producing broods. With higher numbers, there are more ants to collect resources and carry out raids. However, this also has drawbacks: larger colonies exert significant structural pressure on the above-ground nests of wood ants.

=== Nest splitting ===
Wood ants typically have multiple nests, enabling them to relocate in the event of drastic environmental changes. This splitting of nests leads to the formation of additional daughter nests. There are several reasons why wood ants move, including changes in the availability of food resources, attack by other colonies, or changes to the nest itself. During this time, workers, queens, and the brood are transferred from the original nest to the daughter nest in both directions. The goal is to reach the daughter nest, but ants carrying individuals may return to the original nest. The splitting process may last from a week to over a month.

=== Population ===
The turnover rate of wood ant nests is very quick. Over a three-year period, Klimetzek counted 248 nests within a 1,640-hectare (4,100-acre) area under study. No correlation was found between nest age and mortality, although smaller nests had a lower life expectancy than larger nests. Nest size increased with age.

== Bee paralysis virus ==
In 2008, the chronic bee paralysis virus was reported for the first time in F. rufa and another species of ants, Camponotus vagus. CBPV affects bees, ants, and mites.

== Use for making yoghurt ==
Red wood ants have been used in Bulgaria and Turkey to make yoghurt: a few ants are added to warm milk and left to ferment. Modern studies suggest that the ants' formic acid acidulates the milk, enabling microbes from the ants' microbes to thrive, and ant or bacterial enzymes break down milk proteins to produce a yoghurt.
