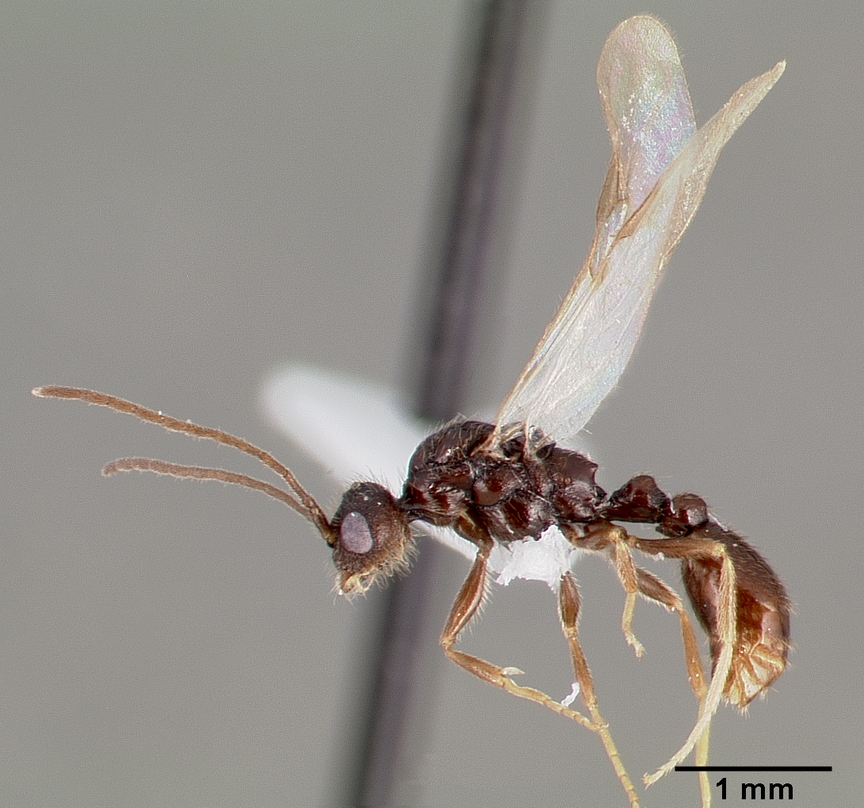

Conservation status
- Vulnerable (IUCN 2.3)

Scientific classification
- Kingdom: Animalia
- Phylum: Arthropoda
- Class: Insecta
- Order: Hymenoptera
- Family: Formicidae
- Subfamily: Myrmicinae
- Genus: Leptothorax
- Species: L. pacis

Binomial name
- Leptothorax pacis (Kutter, 1945)

= Leptothorax pacis =

Species of ant

Leptothorax pacis is a species of ant in the genus Leptothorax. It is endemic to Switzerland.
