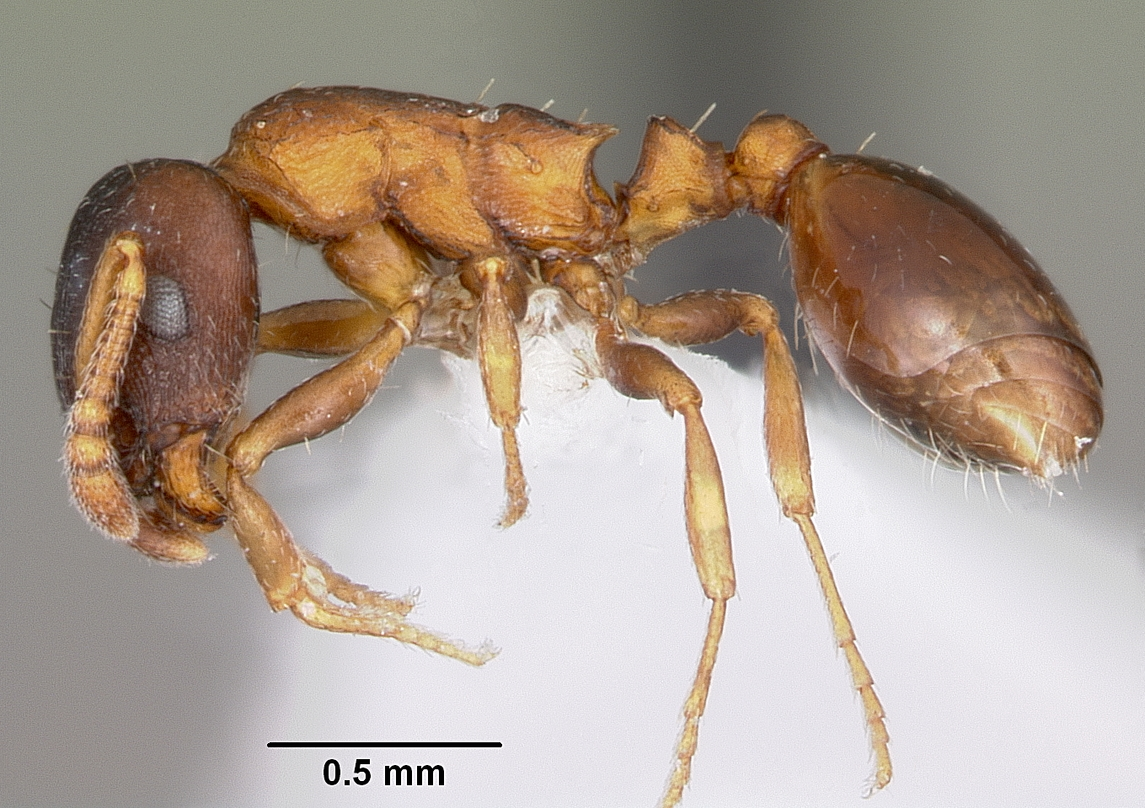
- Leptothorax muscorum worker

Scientific classification
- Kingdom: Animalia
- Phylum: Arthropoda
- Clade: Pancrustacea
- Class: Insecta
- Order: Hymenoptera
- Family: Formicidae
- Subfamily: Myrmicinae
- Genus: Leptothorax
- Species: L. muscorum

Binomial name
- Leptothorax muscorum (Nylander, 1846)

= Leptothorax muscorum =

Species of ant

Leptothorax muscorum is a species of ant of the genus Leptothorax that ranges through a variety of habitats throughout much of Europe, northern Asia, and North and Central America, with a particularly wide distribution in the palearctic. Capable of surviving in extreme Arctic-Alpine conditions, the species is perhaps the northernmost dwelling ant indigenous to the Western Hemisphere.

== Physiology, morphology and taxonomy ==
Several highly similar subspecies of L. muscorum have been identified, including L. m. betulae, L. m. fagi, L. m. flavescens, L. m. gredleri, L. m. nigriceps, L. m. oceanicum, L. m. scamni, L. m. septentrionalis, L. m. sordida, L. m. sordidus, and L. m. uvicensis. A study of enzyme patterns has identified a number of other Leptothorax species (including L. retractus, L. sphagnicolus, and L. crassipilis) which are morphologically and genetically similar enough that some phylogeneticists have classified them as part of a "muscorum group" (a type of taxon "cluster") within Leptothorax.

Workers within a colony are generally small (2.7-3.2 mm) and dark-coloured (black, dark brown or dark red), with multiple morphs of color and size often appearing within a given population, but with each population showing distinctive procilivties towards size and colouring. Workers are typically the darkest members of the colony. The species has an antenna with 11 segments and a propodeum with a pair of short but distinct angled spines between its upper and declivitous faces. Appendage hairs are generally few in number and appressed.

== Ecology and distribution ==
Variants of L. muscorum are found throughout Eurasia, with colonies reported in every European nation, excepting the British Isles, and throughout the east-to-west axis of northern Russia. Species are also found broadly in North America, with colonies in Alaska, Alberta, Arizona, British Columbia, California, Canada, Colorado, Georgia, Maine, Montana, Nevada, New Mexico, Ohio, Pennsylvania, South Dakota, Utah, Washington, and as far south as Mexico. Colonies have been observed as far north as the mouth of the Mackenzie River, which is perhaps a northernmost record for any ant species in the Western Hemisphere. Colonies have been observed at elevations varying from 2–3810 meters, with a 2003 meters average.

The species is found primarily in wooded areas (particularly aspen and coniferous forests with limited ground foliage in mountainous regions), in scrubland, and in open mountain meadows. Colonies are often found under stones, in tree bark, in rotting wood and in moss, from which the species derives its name. Colonies typically contain less than 100 workers, and may have one or numerous queens. Polydomy occurs within the species, with several chambers each containing their own queen and nest linked to a larger colony complex. Like other Leptothorax ants, L. muscorum will often move their nesting locations if the need arises. This process begins with scout workers recruiting individual coworkers to visit a new nesting site via tandem running. If the new nesting location is suitable to the colony's needs, workers stop using tandem running and begin carrying nestmates (brood and queens) to the new nest.
