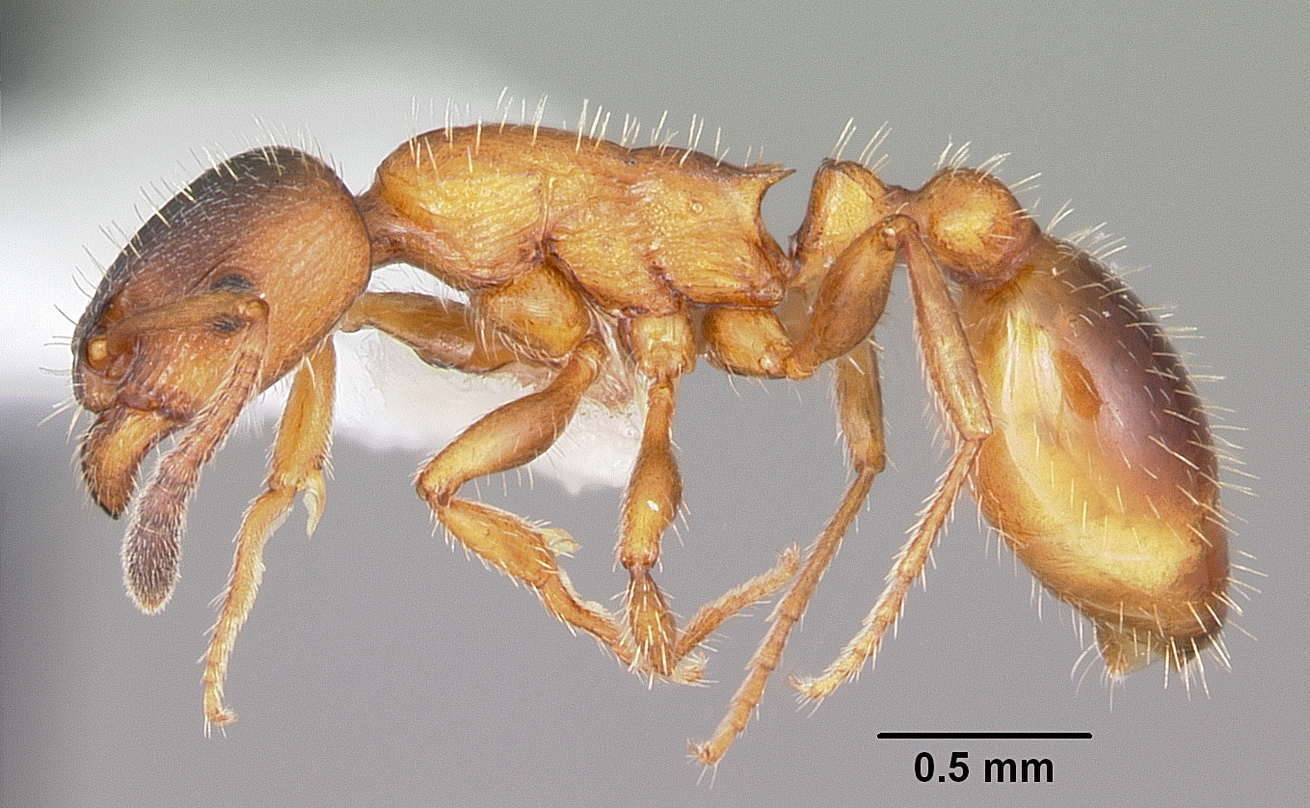
- L. acervorum dealate queen

Scientific classification
- Kingdom: Animalia
- Phylum: Arthropoda
- Class: Insecta
- Order: Hymenoptera
- Family: Formicidae
- Subfamily: Myrmicinae
- Tribe: Crematogastrini
- Alliance: Formicoxenus genus group
- Genus: Leptothorax; Mayr, 1855

Type species
- Formica acervorum Fabricius, 1793

Diversity
- 20 species

Synonyms
- Doronomyrmex Kutter, 1945; Mychothorax Ruzsky, 1904

= Leptothorax =

Genus of ants

Leptothorax is a genus of small ants with mainly Holarctic distributions. The genus is notable for its widespread social parasitism, i.e. they are dependent on the help of workers from other ant species during a part or the whole of their life cycles.

Closely related genera are Cardiocondyla, Stereomyrmex and Romblonella.

== Species ==
- Leptothorax acervorum (Fabricius, 1793)
- Leptothorax athabasca Buschinger & Schulz, 2008
- Leptothorax buschingeri Kutter, 1967
- Leptothorax calderoni Creighton, 1950
- Leptothorax canadensis Provancher, 1887
- Leptothorax crassipilis Wheeler, 1917
- Leptothorax faberi Buschinger, 1983
- Leptothorax goesswaldi Kutter, 1967
- Leptothorax gredleri Mayr, 1855
- Leptothorax kutteri Buschinger, 1966
- Leptothorax muscorum (Nylander, 1846)
- Leptothorax oceanicus (Kuznetsov-Ugamsky, 1928)
- Leptothorax pacis (Kutter, 1945)
- Leptothorax paraxenus Heinze & Alloway, 1992
- Leptothorax pocahontas (Buschinger, 1979)
- Leptothorax retractus Francoeur, 1986
- Leptothorax scamni Ruzsky, 1905
- Leptothorax sphagnicola Francoeur, 1986
- Leptothorax tibeticus Seifert, 2023
- Leptothorax wilsoni Heinze, 1989
