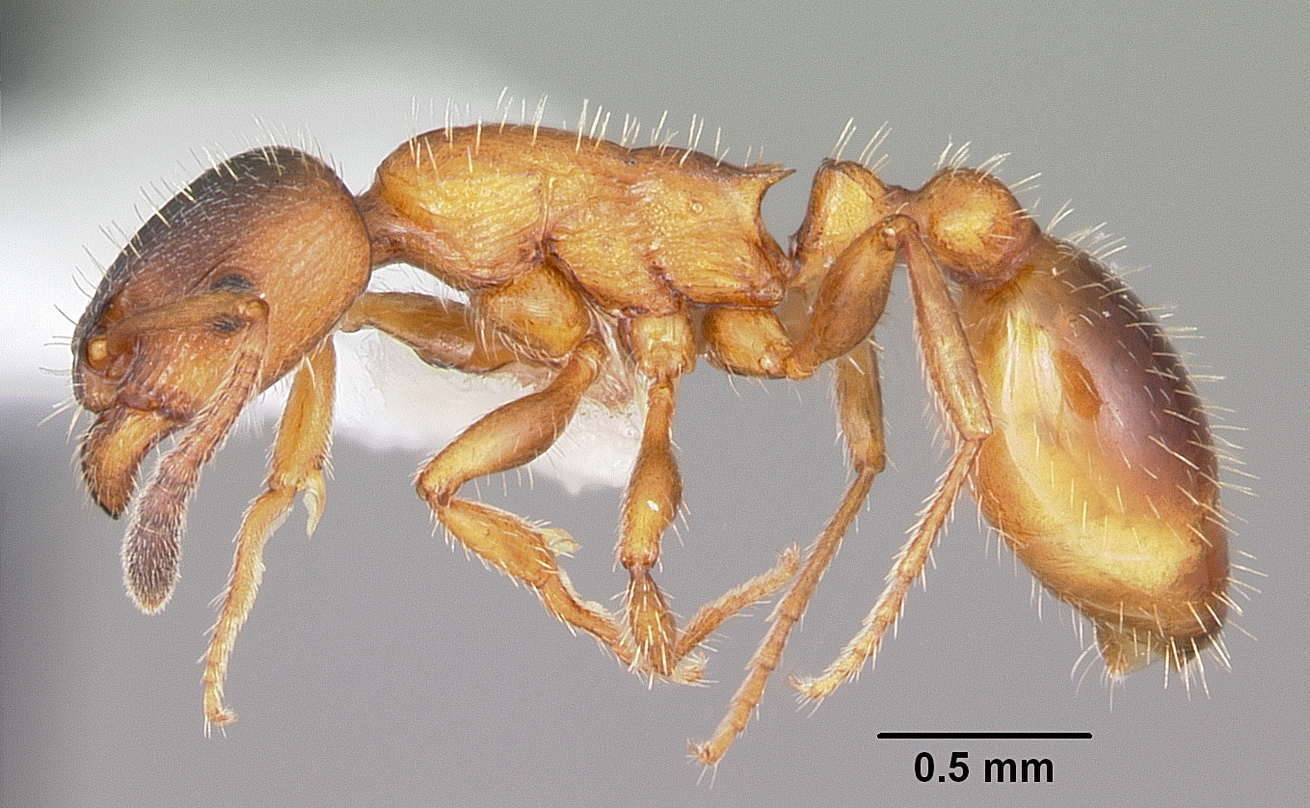

Scientific classification
- Kingdom: Animalia
- Phylum: Arthropoda
- Clade: Pancrustacea
- Class: Insecta
- Order: Hymenoptera
- Family: Formicidae
- Subfamily: Myrmicinae
- Genus: Leptothorax
- Species: L. acervorum

Binomial name
- Leptothorax acervorum (Fabricius, 1793)

Subspecies
- Leptothorax acervorum vandeli Bondroit, 1920

Synonyms
- Formica acervorum Fabricius, 1793; Leptothorax acervorum kamtshaticus Ruzsky, 1920; Leptothorax acervorum nigrescens Ruzsky, 1905; Leptothorax acervorum superus Ruzsky, 1905; Mychothorax acervorum orientalis Kuznetsov-Ugamsky, 1928; Myrmica lacteipennis Zetterstedt, 1838

= Leptothorax acervorum =

Species of ant

Leptothorax acervorum is a small brown to yellow ant in the subfamily Myrmicinae. It was first described by Johan Christian Fabricius in 1793. L. acervorum is vastly distributed across the globe, most commonly found in the coniferous forests of Central, Western and Northern Europe. The morphology of L. acervorum is extremely similar to that of other Leptothorax ants. The difference arises in the two-toned appearance of L. acervorum, with the head and metasoma being darker than the mesosoma segment of the body, and hair across its body. Following Bergmann's rule—unusually, for ectothermic animals—body size increases with latitude.

== Taxonomy ==
Leptothorax acervorum was first described by Johan Christian Fabricius in 1793 in his publication Entomologia systematica emendata et aucta. Vol 2. The ant belongs to the family of Formicidae, which include all organisms that contain a metapleural gland. Using DNA analysis, the divergence date estimated for clades within the Formicidae imply that most ant subfamilies originate in the late Cretaceous period. The subfamilies would have diverged around the Paleogene period. This species of ant is usually found in mid to northern Europe, regions in North America such as Alaska and northern Canada and in Japan.

L. acervorum are small myrmicine ants with distinct propodeal spines and have three-segmented antennal clubs.

Based on a taxonomy experiment performed by Dekoninck, the entire body of L. acervorum is light brown in color and is covered with erect hairs. The region on the head and the antennal club are slightly darker in colour. The thorax was described as being light brown in colour and having a rounded shoulder.

== Morphology ==
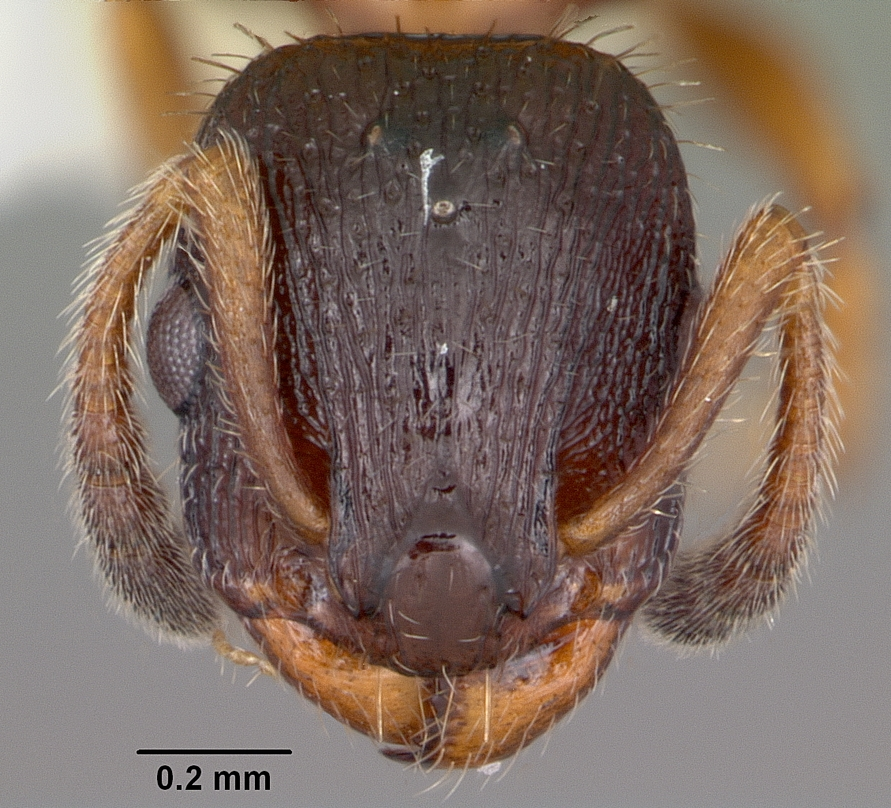
Leptothorax acervorum head

Leptothorax acervorum is a small red ant Similar to other ants, L. acercorum displays geniculate (elbowed) antennae, metapleural glands, and a constriction of the second abdominal segment. The exoskeleton provides a protecting casing of the body, which can be divided into 3 segments: the head, mesosoma, and metasoma. The head contains eyes that detect acute movement, three small ocelli to detect light and polarization, and two mandibles. Attached to the head are two antennae. All six legs are attached to the mesosoma. The metasoma houses vital internal organs. "The pedicel of the metasoma is two-segmented," which is unique for the Subfamily Myrmicinae. The head and abdomen are dark, thereby giving the ant a two-toned appearance. Individual ants are small, with workers measuring around 3 millimetres (0.12 in) in length and queens being only 10% larger. Colonies are small compared to those of other ants—they have anywhere from a few dozen to a few hundred workers and one to several queens.

=== Workers ===
The workers have reddish to brownish yellow body colour with the head, antennal club and dorsal surface being darker. The petiole nodes and femora are frequently infuscate. They have a total of 11 segments in antennae. The head is longitudinally striated, and smooth and the average length is usually 3.7–4.5 mm.

=== Queen ===
The queen is similar in appearance to the worker. However, the colouring of the queen is a dark brown, sometimes almost completely black. The average length of the queen is between 3.8–4.8 mm.

=== Male ===
The male is brownish black in color and is robust and significantly larger than both the worker and the queen. It has an antenna with 12 segments with a very short scape. The average length is between 4.5–5 mm long.

=== Size variance ===
Bergmann's rule establishes that among endothermic animals of the same species, body size increases with latitude. Studies have tested whether this rule also applies to social insects. L. acervorum workers were counted in a sample of colonies from Erlangen and Karelia. The worker size was significantly larger in the Karelian population, with the average thorax length being 1.15 mm ± 0.07 mm. The average thorax length from the Erlangen population was 1.08 ± 0.05 mm. As evidenced, the workers from Karelia were on average 10% larger than the workers from Erlangen. The results suggest that larger body sizes in L. acervorum from boreal habitats might result from selection for increased fasting endurance. Larger workers had more fat than small workers, and would survive longer in colder environments. Leptothorax acervorum might extend their survival time in areas with long winters and unpredictable climate by storing more reserves. Thus, the body size of workers of this holarctic ant increases with latitude.

== Distribution ==
=== Habitat ===
Leptothorax acervorum are commonly found in dry coniferous forests, where they nest in small rotting branches, tree stumps, and under bark. However, colonies that inhabit the periphery of its range are patchily distributed. Patchy distribution is positively correlated with an increase in latitude because, in the case that a queen leaves its colony due to a resource deficit, there is a low possibility that it will find and thereby compete with another one. The ideal environment for this species consists of temperate or subtropical biomes, in which resources are readily available for survival and success of the colony.

=== Geographical range ===
Leptothorax acervorum vastly populate Central, Western, and Northern Europe, ranging from central Spain and Italy (40° N) to the tundra/taiga ecotone habitats of northern Scandinavia and Siberia (40° N). This species typically lives in facultatively polygynous colonies. They can, however, exist in monogynous colonies at the periphery of its geographic range. When this species is found at the margins, where resources for survival may not be as readily available, areas for colony development and nesting are less frequently found. For instance, according to Trettin et al., in the northern mountain ranges of Spain, colonies were found to be functionally monogynous; here, the survival of the colonies were presumed to be at risk, unlike those that preferably exist at “low-skew” population of Boreal Eurasia.”.

Heinze et al. identified another relationship relating to the ant's geographical range. As the latitude of the colonies' expanded outward, the mean body size of each individual worker ant increased as well. The authors point out that ants living near the Polar Circle were 10% larger than those living in central Europe. They attribute this relationship to a "Bergmann's rule-like pattern" for the ectothermic ant. Bergmann's rule states populations and species of larger size tend to be found in colder environments, while smaller organisms are found in warmer regions. In accordance with this principle, Heinze et al. suggest that larger body size in L. acervorum from boreal habitats could be a result of selection for increased fasting endurance. In other words, in colder environments, the ants evolved larger body size in response to the adaptation of increased fasting endurance under starvation conditions, or peripheral habitats with a lack of resources.

== Ecology and behavior ==
=== Queen behavior ===
Two L. acervorum queens fighting each other

Leptothorax acervorum is a model organism to investigate the social structure of multiple-queen colonies. Leptothorax acervorum is a facultatively polygynous ant, meaning that colonies with one or more than one queen occur, and these colonies acquire extra queens by adoption—thus polygyny is secondary. Electrophoretic allozyme analysis showed that cohabiting queens are close relatives. This reinforces the assumption that the queens in L. acervorum colonies form mother-daughter-sister groups, which arise from adopting newly mated queens into their natal nests.

Newly eclosed queens mate with unrelated males near the natal nest and then return to it, where they are readopted. Other queens disperse to mating aggregations, mate, and then leave the aggregations to establish new colonies elsewhere. Matings near the nest may occur because L. acervorum queens 'call' males through the use of pheromones.

==== Oophagy ====
An important behavior noticed in L. acervorum was the eating of reproductive eggs by queens. On average, approximately 69% of eggs eaten were intact. Also in observed colonies, the proportions of eggs eaten out of all eggs laid were 25%, 93%, 125% (i.e. more eggs were eaten than laid in that period) and 64%. This oophagy had a major impact on the colony's output of eggs. The queens appeared to exhibit no discrimination when targeting eggs. It was actually observed that one queen interrupted an egg-eating queen and removed the egg to eat it herself. Feeding rate is positively correlated with fecundity. In the four colonies where intact eggs were eaten, one of the two most fecund queens was among the top two egg eaters.

A L. acervorum queen eats eggs by picking up the egg with her mandibles and manipulating it against her mouthparts with her forefeet. She pierces the egg's membranous skin and laps the egg's fluid through the hole. When the contents of the egg are emptied, typically after a few minutes, the queen will then discard the remaining skin by either dropping it to the floor or placing it on the mouthparts of a larva (which then eats the skin).

A possible explanation for this phenomenon is reproductive competition between queens. However, the overall lack of egg defense and overt aggression seem to provide contrary evidence. It is possible that direct confrontation would increase risk of injury for the egg-laying queen, thereby making egg defense too costly.

=== Colony structure ===
Trivers and Hare (1976) proposed that the population-level sex-investment ratio equals the relatedness asymmetry, so there can be conflict between workers and queens over sex allocation. Thus, the prediction is that sex-investment ratios are 1:1 females:males if queens control sex allocation and 3:1 females:males if there is worker control. This is because the queen is equally related to her sons and daughters (r=0.5 in each case), so she should produce equal numbers of male and female reproductive offspring. However, because of haplodiploidy, full sisters are more closely related to one another because half of their genome is always identical, and the other half has a 50% chance of being shared. Their total relatedness is 0.5+(0.5 x 0.5)=0.75. This means sisters would prefer to skew the population sex-investment ratio to 3:1 females:males. A female is related to her brother by only 0.25, because 50% of her genes that come from her father have no chance of being shared with a brother. This results in 0.5 x 0.5=0.25.

It was found that the population sex-investment ratio for "L. acervorum" changed from significantly female biased to significantly male biased with increasing polygyny. In polygynous colonies where multiple queens reproduce, there is a lack of worker aggression towards queens. This is likely a benefit for multiple queens that reproduce in polygynous populations as a result of dilution of relatedness. Workers simply favor the previous reproductive queen because she is their mother, and would thereby rear full sisters. Thus, multiple reproductive queens would decrease this worker regulation because relatedness is lower. The relatedness estimate for nest mate workers in polygynous colonies (0.46 ± 0.040) was significantly lower than that for nest mate workers in monogynous colonies (0.55 ± 0.089). However, this relatedness estimate for nest mate workers in monogynous colonies was distinctly lower than the expected 0.75 value for full siblings.

Seasonal fluctuations of queen numbers may explain why relatedness estimates for workers in monogamous colonies are lower than expected. The seasons shape the composition of the colony—young queens are regularly adopted in their natal colonies after mating in late summer. By seeking adoption in established colonies, young queens might avoid long solitary hibernation—winter mortality was found to be lower in polygynous than in monogynous colonies. Some emigrate from the colony after hibernation in the spring. This may be an attempt to found their own colony solitarily or by budding, leaving the natal colony with their own workers and brood to start a new colony. Some monogynous colonies could have recently been polygynous. Thus, colonies of L. acervorum may easily switch from monogamy to polygyny as a result of adopting young queens and budding, or queen emigration.

=== Mating behavior ===
In a study conducted in Spain, L. acervorum became active in the incubators about one or two hours after the morning rise in temperature. At that time, mating behavior could be studied under natural daylight. When the temperature reached 25 °C, the winged females left the nest chambers and climbed the walls of the flight cage to perform a stationary sexual calling behavior. Other females exhibited a sexual display at very short distances from the nest entrance. Flying before the sexual calling was never observed.

The males were always highly aroused when put into a flight cage with calling females, and they immediately tried to mount a calling female and to insert the genitals. During the first contact both partners antennate each other intensively. After the insertion of the genitals the male tilts backwards and remains immobile in this position. The female usually sits still during the copulation and the male sometimes grooms its antennae. After 30 to 90 seconds the female turns round and bites into the male's gaster, which typically ends with separation 10 to 20 seconds later. Copulations could be observed until six or seven hours after the morning rise in temperature, though most copulations took place between one and two hours after the first females began to exhibit sexual calling.
