= List of Temnothorax species =

This is a list of valid species and subspecies of the myrmicine ant genus Temnothorax, including the acorn ants, numerous dulotic and parasitic species, and related species. There are over 500 valid species in this genus as of 2026.

== List ==
=== Extant species ===
- Temnothorax abeli (Fontenla Rizo, 1998)
- Temnothorax achii Prebus, 2021
- Temnothorax acuminatus Prebus, 2021
- Temnothorax acutispinosus Prebus, 2021
- Temnothorax adlerzi (Douwes et al., 1988)
- Temnothorax adustus (Mackay, 2000)
- Temnothorax aeolius (Forel, 1911)
- Temnothorax affinis (Mayr, 1855)
- Temnothorax agavicola Prebus, 2021
- Temnothorax akrotiriensis Salata et al., 2024
- Temnothorax alayoi (Baroni Urbani, 1978)
- Temnothorax albipennis (Curtis, 1854)
- Temnothorax albispinus (Wheeler, 1908)
- Temnothorax alfacarensis Tinaut & Reyes-López, 2020
- Temnothorax algerianus (Cagniant, 1968)
- Temnothorax algiricus (Forel, 1894)
- Temnothorax alienus Schulz et al., 2007
- Temnothorax alinae (Radchenko, 1994)
- Temnothorax allardycei (Mann, 1920)
- Temnothorax almeqeri Sharaf, 2019
- Temnothorax alpinus (Ruzsky, 1902)
- Temnothorax altinodus Prebus, 2021
- Temnothorax ambiguus (Emery, 1895)
- Temnothorax americanus (Emery, 1895)
- Temnothorax anacanthus (Santschi, 1912)
- Temnothorax anaphalantus Snelling et al., 2014
- Temnothorax andersoni (Mackay, 2000)
- Temnothorax andrei (Emery, 1895)
- Temnothorax androsanus (Wheeler, 1905)
- Temnothorax angulinodis Csősz et al., 2015
- Temnothorax angulohumerus Zhou et al., 2010
- Temnothorax angustifrons Csősz et al., 2015
- Temnothorax angustulus (Nylander, 1856)
- Temnothorax anira (Terayama & Onoyama, 1999)
- Temnothorax annexus (Baroni Urbani, 1978)
- Temnothorax annibalis (Santschi, 1909)
- Temnothorax anodonta (Arnol'di, 1977)
- Temnothorax anodontoides (Dlussky & Zabelin, 1985)
- Temnothorax ansei Catarineu et al., 2017
- Temnothorax antera (Terayama & Onoyama, 1999)
- Temnothorax antigoni (Forel, 1911)
- Temnothorax apenninicus Csősz et al., 2024
- Temnothorax apolloni Salata et al., 2024
- Temnothorax arabicus Sharaf & Akbar, 2017
- Temnothorax arboreus Snelling et al., 2014
- Temnothorax arbustus Prebus, 2021
- Temnothorax arcanus (Kutter, 1973)
- Temnothorax archangelskiji (Kuznetsov-Ugamsky, 1926)
- Temnothorax arenarius (Santschi, 1908)
- Temnothorax argentipes (Wheeler, 1928)
- Temnothorax ariadnae Csősz et al., 2015
- Temnothorax arimensis (Azuma, 1977)
- Temnothorax arkasi Salata & Borowiec, 2022
- Temnothorax arnoldii Radchenko & Fedoseeva, 2015
- Temnothorax arpini (Tarbinsky, 1976)
- Temnothorax artvinensis Seifert, 2006
- Temnothorax arunachalensis Rilta & Bharti, 2025
- Temnothorax atlantis (Santschi, 1911)
- Temnothorax atomus (Cagniant & Espadaler, 1997)
- Temnothorax augusti (Baroni Urbani, 1978)
- Temnothorax auresianus (Santschi, 1929)
- Temnothorax aureus Prebus, 2021
- Temnothorax aveli (Bondroit, 1918)
- Temnothorax aztecoides Prebus, 2021
- Temnothorax aztecus (Wheeler, 1931)
- Temnothorax baeticus (Emery, 1924)
- Temnothorax bahoruco Prebus, 2021
- Temnothorax bailu Qian & Xu, 2024
- Temnothorax balaclava Prebus, 2021
- Temnothorax balcanicus (Santschi, 1909)
- Temnothorax balnearius Prebus, 2021
- Temnothorax banao (Fontenla Rizo, 1998)
- Temnothorax barbouri (Aguayo, 1931)
- Temnothorax barrettoi Hamer & Guénard, 2023
- Temnothorax barroi (Aguayo, 1931)
- Temnothorax barryi (Cagniant, 1967)
- Temnothorax basara (Terayama & Onoyama, 1999)
- Temnothorax bejaraniensis Reyes-López & Carpintero-Ortega, 2013
- Temnothorax bermudezi (Wheeler, 1931)
- Temnothorax bernardi (Espadaler, 1982)
- Temnothorax bestelmeyeri (Mackay, 2000)
- Temnothorax bicolor (Mackay, 2000)
- Temnothorax bikara (Terayama & Onoyama, 1999)
- Temnothorax bimbache (Espadaler, 2007)
- Temnothorax birgitae (Schulz, 1994)
- Temnothorax bison Prebus, 2021
- Temnothorax blascoi (Espadaler, 1997)
- Temnothorax boltoni Rilta & Bharti, 2025
- Temnothorax brackoi Salata & Borowiec, 2019
- Temnothorax bradleyi (Wheeler, 1913)
- Temnothorax brauneri (Ruzsky, 1905)
- Temnothorax brevidentis Prebus, 2015
- Temnothorax brevispinosus (Mackay, 2000)
- Temnothorax brevispinus (Chang & He, 2001)
- Temnothorax bristoli (Mackay, 2000)
- Temnothorax bruneri (Mann, 1924)
- Temnothorax brunneus (Cagniant, 1985)
- Temnothorax bucheti (Santschi, 1909)
- Temnothorax buddha Subedi et al., 2023
- Temnothorax bugnioni (Forel, 1894)
- Temnothorax bulgaricus (Forel, 1892)
- Temnothorax cabrerae (Forel, 1893)
- Temnothorax caesari (Espadaler, 1997)
- Temnothorax cagnianti (Tinaut, 1983)
- Temnothorax caguatan Snelling et al., 2014
- Temnothorax canescens (Santschi, 1908)
- Temnothorax carinatus (Cole, 1957)
- Temnothorax caryaluteus Prebus et al., 2024
- Temnothorax casanovai Prebus, 2021
- Temnothorax cenatus (Bolton, 1982)
- Temnothorax cerastarum Salata et al., 2024
- Temnothorax chandleri (Mackay, 2000)
- Temnothorax chun Qian & Xu, 2024
- Temnothorax chunfen Qian & Xu, 2024
- Temnothorax chushu Qian & Xu, 2024
- Temnothorax ciferrii (Menozzi & Russo, 1930)
- Temnothorax clypeatus (Mayr, 1853)
- Temnothorax cokendolpheri (Mackay, 2000)
- Temnothorax coleenae (Mackay, 2000)
- Temnothorax conatensis Galkowski & Lebas, 2016
- Temnothorax confucii (Forel, 1912)
- Temnothorax congruus (Smith, 1874)
- Temnothorax convexus (Forel, 1894)
- Temnothorax cornibrevis (Collingwood, 1961)
- Temnothorax corsicus (Emery, 1895)
- Temnothorax corticalis (Schenck, 1852)
- Temnothorax crasecundus Seifert & Csősz, 2015
- Temnothorax crassispinus (Karavaiev, 1926)
- Temnothorax crassistriatus Salata et al., 2018
- Temnothorax creightoni (Mann, 1929)
- Temnothorax creolus (Baroni Urbani, 1978)
- Temnothorax crepuscularis (Tinaut, 1995)
- Temnothorax cristinae (Espadaler, 1997)
- Temnothorax cuneinodis Radchenko, 2004
- Temnothorax curtisetosus Salata & Borowiec, 2015
- Temnothorax curtulus (Santschi, 1929)
- Temnothorax curvispinosus (Mayr, 1866)
- Temnothorax cypridis (Santschi, 1930)
- Temnothorax dahan Qian & Xu, 2024
- Temnothorax daidalosi Salata et al., 2018
- Temnothorax darlingtoni (Wheeler, 1937)
- Temnothorax dashu Qian & Xu, 2024
- Temnothorax daxue Qian & Xu, 2024
- Temnothorax delaparti (Forel, 1890)
- Temnothorax desertorum Dlussky & Soyunov, 1988
- Temnothorax desioi (Menozzi, 1939)
- Temnothorax dessyi (Menozzi, 1936)
- Temnothorax discoloratus (Arnol'di, 1977)
- Temnothorax dissimilis (Aguayo, 1932)
- Temnothorax ditifet (Espadaler, 1997)
- Temnothorax dlusskyi Radchenko et al., 2015
- Temnothorax dong Qian & Xu, 2024
- Temnothorax dongzhi Qian & Xu, 2024
- Temnothorax duloticus (Wesson, 1937)
- Temnothorax eburneipes (Wheeler, 1927)
- Temnothorax elmenshawyi Sharaf et al., 2019
- Temnothorax emmae (Mackay, 2000)
- Temnothorax eocho (Borowiec & Salata, 2025)
- Temnothorax estel González, 2021
- Temnothorax euboeae Salata & Borowiec, 2022
- Temnothorax evagorae Salata et al., 2024
- Temnothorax exilis (Emery, 1869)
- Temnothorax finzii (Menozzi, 1925)
- Temnothorax flavicornis (Emery, 1870)
- Temnothorax flavidulus (Wheeler & Mann, 1914)
- Temnothorax flavispinus (André, 1883)
- Temnothorax foreli (Santschi, 1907)
- Temnothorax formosus (Santschi, 1909)
- Temnothorax fortispinosus Prebus, 2021
- Temnothorax fragosus (Mackay & Buschinger, 2002)
- Temnothorax fuentei (Santschi, 1919)
- Temnothorax fultonii (Forel, 1902)
- Temnothorax fumosus (Ruzsky, 1923)
- Temnothorax furunculus (Wheeler, 1909)
- Temnothorax fuscatus (Mann, 1920)
- Temnothorax fynor Fisher, 2025
- Temnothorax gaetulus (Santschi, 1923)
- Temnothorax gallae (Smith, 1949)
- Temnothorax gallei Csősz et al., 2025
- Temnothorax gentilis (Santschi, 1923)
- Temnothorax georgicus Ward et al., 2015
- Temnothorax gibbifer (Baroni Urbani, 1978)
- Temnothorax goniops (Baroni Urbani, 1978)
- Temnothorax gordiagini (Ruzsky, 1902)
- Temnothorax gracilicornis (Emery, 1882)
- Temnothorax graecus (Forel, 1911)
- Temnothorax gredosi (Espadaler & Collingwood, 1982)
- Temnothorax grouvellei (Bondroit, 1918)
- Temnothorax gui Wei et al., 2024
- Temnothorax gundlachi (Wheeler, 1913)
- Temnothorax guyu Qian & Xu, 2024
- Temnothorax guzel Zięcina et al., 2025
- Temnothorax hadrumetensis (Santschi, 1918)
- Temnothorax haira (Terayama & Onoyama, 1999)
- Temnothorax hanluQian & Xu, 2024
- Temnothorax harlequina Prebus, 2021
- Temnothorax haveni Lee et al., 2023
- Temnothorax helenae Csősz et al., 2015
- Temnothorax hengshanensis (Huang et al., 2004)
- Temnothorax hesperius (Santschi, 1909)
- Temnothorax himachalensis Bharti et al., 2012
- Temnothorax himalaicus Yusupov et al., 2020
- Temnothorax hippolyta Prebus, 2021
- Temnothorax hippomenesi Salata et al., 2024
- Temnothorax hispaniolae (Baroni Urbani, 1978)
- Temnothorax hispidus (Cole, 1957)
- Temnothorax huatuo Terayama, 2009
- Temnothorax huehuetenangoi (Baroni Urbani, 1978)
- Temnothorax hyrcanus (Dubovikoff & Radchenko, 2010)
- Temnothorax ibericus (Menozzi, 1922)
- Temnothorax ikarosi Salata et al., 2018
- Temnothorax incompletus Salata et al., 2018
- Temnothorax indra (Terayama & Onoyama, 1999)
- Temnothorax inermis (Forel, 1902)
- Temnothorax inquilinus Ward et al., 2015
- Temnothorax interruptus (Schenck, 1852)
- Temnothorax iranicus (Radchenko, 1994)
- Temnothorax iris (Roger, 1863)
- Temnothorax isabellae (Wheeler, 1908)
- Temnothorax italicus (Consani, 1952)
- Temnothorax ixili (Baroni Urbani, 1978)
- Temnothorax jailensis (Arnol'di, 1977)
- Temnothorax janushevi (Radchenko, 1994)
- Temnothorax jingzhe Qian & Xu, 2024
- Temnothorax josephi (Mackay, 2000)
- Temnothorax kashmirensis Bharti et al., 2012
- Temnothorax kaszabi (Pisarski, 1969)
- Temnothorax kathmanduensis Subedi et al., 2023
- Temnothorax kemali (Santschi, 1934)
- Temnothorax khatrii Yusupov et al., 2020
- Temnothorax kinomurai (Terayama & Onoyama, 1999)
- Temnothorax kipyatkovi Yusupov et al., 2020
- Temnothorax kirghizicus (Tarbinsky, 1976)
- Temnothorax korbi (Emery, 1924)
- Temnothorax koreanus (Teranishi, 1940)
- Temnothorax kraussei (Emery, 1915)
- Temnothorax kubira (Terayama & Onoyama, 1999)
- Temnothorax kuixing Terayama, 2009
- Temnothorax kurilensis (Radchenko, 1994)
- Temnothorax kutteri (Cagniant, 1973)
- Temnothorax kykkos Salata et al., 2024
- Temnothorax laciniatus (Stitz, 1917)
- Temnothorax laconicus Csősz et al., 2014
- Temnothorax laestrygon (Santschi, 1931)
- Temnothorax laetus (Wheeler, 1937)
- Temnothorax lagrecai (Baroni Urbani, 1964)
- Temnothorax lailae Csősz et al., 2025
- Temnothorax laticrus Prebus, 2021
- Temnothorax laurae (Emery, 1884)
- Temnothorax leigong Terayama, 2009
- Temnothorax leimu Terayama, 2009
- Temnothorax leoni (Arnol'di, 1971)
- Temnothorax lereddei (Bernard, 1953)
- Temnothorax leucacanthoides Prebus, 2021
- Temnothorax leucacanthus (Baroni Urbani, 1978)
- Temnothorax leviceps (Emery, 1898)
- Temnothorax leyeensis Zhou et al., 2010
- Temnothorax lichtensteini (Bondroit, 1918)
- Temnothorax lichun Qian & Xu, 2024
- Temnothorax lidong Qian & Xu, 2024
- Temnothorax liebi (Mackay, 2000)
- Temnothorax liqiu Qian & Xu, 2024
- Temnothorax liviae (Agosti & Collingwood, 2011)
- Temnothorax lixia Qian & Xu, 2024
- Temnothorax longicaulis Prebus, 2021
- Temnothorax longinoi Prebus, 2021
- Temnothorax longipilosus (Santschi, 1912)
- Temnothorax longispinosus (Roger, 1863)
- Temnothorax lucidus Csősz et al., 2015
- Temnothorax luteus (Forel, 1874)
- Temnothorax magnabulla Prebus, 2021
- Temnothorax makora (Terayama & Onoyama, 1999)
- Temnothorax mangzhong Qian & Xu, 2024
- Temnothorax manni (Wheeler, 1914)
- Temnothorax maoerensis Zhou et al., 2010
- Temnothorax marae Alicata et al., 2022
- Temnothorax marocanus (Santschi, 1909)
- Temnothorax mauritanicus (Santschi, 1909)
- Temnothorax megalops (Hamann & Klemm, 1967)
- Temnothorax mekira Terayama & Kubota, 2011
- Temnothorax melanieae General, 2025
- Temnothorax melas (Espadaler et al., 1984)
- Temnothorax melleus (Forel, 1904)
- Temnothorax melnikovi (Ruzsky, 1905)
- Temnothorax menozzii (Finzi, 1924)
- Temnothorax messiniaensis Salata & Borowiec, 2019
- Temnothorax mexicanus (Mackay, 2000)
- Temnothorax michali Radchenko, 2004
- Temnothorax microreticulatus Bharti et al., 2012
- Temnothorax mimeuri (Cagniant, 1997)
- Temnothorax minotaurosi Salata et al., 2018
- Temnothorax minozzii (Santschi, 1922)
- Temnothorax minutissimus (Smith, 1942)
- Temnothorax mirabilis (Espadaler & Cagniant, 1996)
- Temnothorax miserabilis (Santschi, 1918)
- Temnothorax misomoschus Prebus, 2021
- Temnothorax mitsukoae Terayama & Yamane, 2013
- Temnothorax mongolicus (Pisarski, 1969)
- Temnothorax monjauzei (Cagniant, 1968)
- Temnothorax morea Csősz et al., 2018
- Temnothorax morongo Snelling et al., 2014
- Temnothorax mortoni (Aguayo, 1937)
- Temnothorax mpala Prebus, 2015
- Temnothorax muellerianus (Finzi, 1922)
- Temnothorax myersi (Wheeler, 1931)
- Temnothorax myrmiciformis Snelling et al., 2014
- Temnothorax mytilenes Salata et al., 2023
- Temnothorax nadigi (Kutter, 1925)
- Temnothorax naeviventris (Santschi, 1910)
- Temnothorax nassonovi (Ruzsky, 1895)
- Temnothorax nebliselva Prebus, 2021
- Temnothorax nebulosus Zięcina et al., 2025
- Temnothorax neminan (Espadaler, 1997)
- Temnothorax neomexicanus (Wheeler, 1903)
- Temnothorax nevadensis (Wheeler, 1903)
- Temnothorax niger (Forel, 1894)
- Temnothorax nigricans (Baroni Urbani, 1978)
- Temnothorax nigriceps (Mayr, 1855)
- Temnothorax nigritus (Emery, 1878)
- Temnothorax nikoklesi Salata et al., 2024
- Temnothorax nipensis (Fontenla Rizo, 1998)
- Temnothorax nitens (Emery, 1895)
- Temnothorax nitidiceps (Emery, 1891)
- Temnothorax nordmeyeri (Schulz, 1997)
- Temnothorax normandi (Santschi, 1912)
- Temnothorax nuwuvi Snelling et al., 2014
- Temnothorax nylanderi (Foerster, 1850)
- Temnothorax obliquicanthus (Cole, 1953)
- Temnothorax obscurior (Dalla Torre, 1893)
- Temnothorax obturator (Wheeler, 1903)
- Temnothorax obtusigaster Prebus, 2021
- Temnothorax ocarinae (Baroni Urbani, 1978)
- Temnothorax oraniensis (Forel, 1894)
- Temnothorax orchidus Zhou et al., 2010
- Temnothorax oreades Salata et al., 2024
- Temnothorax oxianus (Ruzsky, 1905)
- Temnothorax oxynodis (Mackay, 2000)
- Temnothorax paiute Snelling et al., 2014
- Temnothorax pakistanensis Rasheed et al., 2020
- Temnothorax pallidipes (Santschi, 1910)
- Temnothorax pallidus (Collingwood, 1961)
- Temnothorax palustris (Cover & Deyrup, 2004)
- Temnothorax pamiricus (Ruzsky, 1902)
- Temnothorax pan (Santschi, 1936)
- Temnothorax pangchenensis Rilta & Bharti, 2025
- Temnothorax paraztecus Prebus, 2021
- Temnothorax pardoi (Tinaut, 1987)
- Temnothorax parnonensis Salata & Borowiec, 2022
- Temnothorax parralensis Prebus, 2021
- Temnothorax parvidentatus Prebus, 2021
- Temnothorax parvulus (Schenck, 1852)
- Temnothorax pastinifer (Emery, 1894)
- Temnothorax pathibharaensis Subedi et al., 2023
- Temnothorax pelagosanus (Müller, 1923)
- Temnothorax peninsularis (Wheeler, 1934)
- Temnothorax pergandei (Emery, 1895)
- Temnothorax personatus (Cagniant, 1987)
- Temnothorax peyerimhoffi (Santschi, 1929)
- Temnothorax phaetoni Salata et al., 2023
- Temnothorax pilagens Seifert et al., 2014
- Temnothorax pilicornis Prebus, 2021
- Temnothorax pisarskii Radchenko, 2004
- Temnothorax platycephalus (Espadaler, 1997)
- Temnothorax platycnemis (Wheeler, 1937)
- Temnothorax poeyi (Wheeler, 1913)
- Temnothorax poldii Alicata et al., 2022
- Temnothorax politus (Smith, 1939)
- Temnothorax porphyritis (Roger, 1863)
- Temnothorax productus (Santschi, 1918)
- Temnothorax proteii Salata et al., 2018
- Temnothorax pseudandrei Snelling et al., 2014
- Temnothorax pulchellus (Emery, 1894)
- Temnothorax punctaticeps (Mackay, 2000)
- Temnothorax punctatissimus (Mackay, 2000)
- Temnothorax punctithorax (Mackay, 2000)
- Temnothorax punicans (Roger, 1863)
- Temnothorax pupseli (Santschi, 1909)
- Temnothorax purpuratus (Roger, 1863)
- Temnothorax qingming Qian & Xu, 2024
- Temnothorax qiu Qian & Xu, 2024
- Temnothorax qiufen Qian & Xu, 2024
- Temnothorax quasimodo Snelling et al., 2014
- Temnothorax quercicola Prebus, 2021
- Temnothorax quetzal Prebus, 2021
- Temnothorax racovitzai (Bondroit, 1918)
- Temnothorax ravouxi (André, 1896)
- Temnothorax recedens (Nylander, 1856)
- Temnothorax reduncus (Wang & Wu, 1988)
- Temnothorax reticulatus (Chang & He, 2001)
- Temnothorax risii (Forel, 1892)
- Temnothorax rogeri Emery, 1869
- Temnothorax rothneyi (Forel, 1902)
- Temnothorax rottenbergii (Emery, 1870)
- Temnothorax rougeti (Bondroit, 1918)
- Temnothorax rudis (Wheeler, 1917)
- Temnothorax rufus Prebus, 2015
- Temnothorax rugatulus (Emery, 1895)
- Temnothorax ruginosus Zhou et al., 2010
- Temnothorax rugithorax (Mackay, 2000)
- Temnothorax rugosus (Mackay, 2000)
- Temnothorax rugulosus (Mackay, 2000)
- Temnothorax rutabulafer Prebus, 2021
- Temnothorax sallei (Guérin-Méneville, 1852)
- Temnothorax salvini (Forel, 1899)
- Temnothorax santra (Terayama & Onoyama, 1999)
- Temnothorax santschii (Forel, 1905)
- Temnothorax sappho Zięcina et al., 2025
- Temnothorax sardous (Santschi, 1909)
- Temnothorax satunini (Ruzsky, 1902)
- Temnothorax saxatilis Schulz et al., 2007
- Temnothorax saxonicus (Seifert, 1995)
- Temnothorax scabriosus (Santschi, 1909)
- Temnothorax schaufussi (Forel, 1879)
- Temnothorax schaumii (Roger, 1863)
- Temnothorax schmittii (Wheeler, 1903)
- Temnothorax schoedli Seifert, 2006
- Temnothorax schurri (Forel, 1902)
- Temnothorax schwarzi (Mann, 1920)
- Temnothorax semenovi (Ruzsky, 1903)
- Temnothorax semiruber (André, 1881)
- Temnothorax senectutis (Baroni Urbani, 1978)
- Temnothorax sentosus Ward et al., 2015
- Temnothorax serviculus (Ruzsky, 1902)
- Temnothorax sevanensis (Arnol'di, 1977)
- Temnothorax shannxiensis Zhou et al., 2010
- Temnothorax shelkovnikovi (Karavaiev, 1926)
- Temnothorax shuangjiang Qian & Xu, 2024
- Temnothorax siculus Schifani et al., 2025
- Temnothorax silvestrii (Santschi, 1911)
- Temnothorax simesno (Cagniant & Espadaler, 1997)
- Temnothorax simlensis (Forel, 1904)
- Temnothorax singularis (Radchenko, 1994)
- Temnothorax sirindhornae Phosrithong et al., 2025
- Temnothorax skwarrae (Wheeler, 1931)
- Temnothorax smithi (Baroni Urbani, 1978)
- Temnothorax smyrnensis (Forel, 1911)
- Temnothorax solerii (Menozzi, 1936)
- Temnothorax solidinodus Prebus, 2015
- Temnothorax sordidulus (Müller, 1923)
- Temnothorax spinosior (Forel, 1901)
- Temnothorax spinosus (Forel, 1909)
- Temnothorax splendens (Wheeler, 1905)
- Temnothorax squamifer (Roger, 1863)
- Temnothorax steinbergi (Arnol'di, 1971)
- Temnothorax stenotyle (Cole, 1956)
- Temnothorax stollii (Forel, 1885)
- Temnothorax striatulus (Stitz, 1937)
- Temnothorax striatus Zhou et al., 2010
- Temnothorax strymonensis Csősz et al., 2018
- Temnothorax stumperi (Kutter, 1950)
- Temnothorax subcingulatus (Emery, 1924)
- Temnothorax subditivus (Wheeler, 1903)
- Temnothorax suberis (Forel, 1894)
- Temnothorax subtilis Csősz et al., 2015
- Temnothorax susamyri (Dlussky, 1965)
- Temnothorax taivanensis (Wheeler, 1929)
- Temnothorax tamriensis Ajerrar et al., 2018
- Temnothorax tarbinskii (Arnol'di, 1976)
- Temnothorax tebessae (Forel, 1890)
- Temnothorax tembotovi Radchenko & Yusupov, 2015
- Temnothorax tenuisculptus (Baroni Urbani, 1978)
- Temnothorax tenuispinus (Santschi, 1911
- Temnothorax tergestinus (Finzi, 1928)
- Temnothorax terraztecus Prebus, 2021
- Temnothorax terricola (Mann, 1920)
- Temnothorax terrigena (Wheeler, 1903)
- Temnothorax tesquorum (Arnol'di, 1977)
- Temnothorax texanus (Wheeler, 1903)
- Temnothorax theryi (Santschi, 1921)
- Temnothorax tianpeng Terayama, 2009
- Temnothorax tianschanicus (Tarbinsky, 1976)
- Temnothorax torrei (Aguayo, 1931)
- Temnothorax totonicapani (Baroni Urbani, 1978)
- Temnothorax trabutii (Forel, 1894)
- Temnothorax tramieri (Cagniant, 1983)
- Temnothorax triangularis Salata & Borowiec, 2019
- Temnothorax tricarinatus (Emery, 1895)
- Temnothorax tricolor (Santschi, 1925)
- Temnothorax tuberum (Fabricius, 1775)
- Temnothorax turcicus (Santschi, 1934)
- Temnothorax turritellus (Espadaler, 1997)
- Temnothorax tuscaloosae (Wilson, 1951)
- Temnothorax tuxtlanus Prebus, 2021
- Temnothorax tyndalei (Forel, 1909)
- Temnothorax unifasciatus (Latreille, 1798)
- Temnothorax universitatis (Espadaler, 1997)
- Temnothorax usunkul (Ruzsky, 1924)
- Temnothorax variabilis Salata et al., 2018
- Temnothorax versicolor (Roger, 1863)
- Temnothorax villarensis (Aguayo, 1931)
- Temnothorax violaceus (Mann, 1924)
- Temnothorax vivianoi Schifani et al., 2022
- Temnothorax volgensis (Ruzsky, 1905)
- Temnothorax wardi Snelling et al., 2014
- Temnothorax wettereri Prebus, 2021
- Temnothorax wheeleri (Mann, 1920)
- Temnothorax whitfordi (Mackay, 2000)
- Temnothorax wilsoni Prebus, 2021
- Temnothorax wollastoni (Donisthorpe, 1940)
- Temnothorax wroughtonii (Forel, 1904)
- Temnothorax wui (Wheeler, 1929)
- Temnothorax xanthos Radchenko, 2004
- Temnothorax xia Qian & Xu, 2024
- Temnothorax xiaohan Qian & Xu, 2024
- Temnothorax xiaoman Qian & Xu, 2024
- Temnothorax xiaoshu Qian & Xu, 2024
- Temnothorax xiaoxue Qian & Xu, 2024
- Temnothorax xiazhi Qian & Xu, 2024
- Temnothorax xincai Prebus, 2021
- Temnothorax yanwan Terayama, 2009
- Temnothorax yushui Qian & Xu, 2024
- Temnothorax zabelini (Radchenko, 1989)
- Temnothorax zhejiangensis Zhou et al., 2010

=== Extinct species ===
- †Temnothorax praecreolus (De Andrade, 1992)
