= List of ants of Andorra =

Seventy-five ant species have been recorded in Andorra, a small landlocked country located in the heart of the Pyrenees and bordered by Spain and France. The country covers an area of approximately 468 km^{2} (181 sq mi). The ant fauna of Andorra is mostly dominated by Central European species (some are typical cold climate specialists); however species belonging to the Mediterranean ant fauna are also found. This can be explained by the particular geographic situation of Andorra which is characterized by a high mountain Mediterranean climate.

With 75 species recorded, the ant fauna of Andorra can be considered as highly diverse, especially considering the size of the country. The species are distributed across 21 genera belonging to 4 subfamilies (Dolichoderinae, Formicinae, Myrmicinae, Ponerinae). The most speciose subfamily was Myrmicinae and the most speciose genus was Formica with 36 and 14 species respectively. The number of ant species collected represents more than one third of the number of species found in France (213) species and about a quarter of the total number of species recorded in the Iberian Peninsula (299 species). When considered at the scale of the Pyrenees, Andorra contains about 88% of the ant species recorded in these mountains above an altitude of 1,000 m (about 85 species).

This checklist is based on Bernadou et al. (2013), who notes that the total number of species could actually be somewhat higher. Very few parasitic species are recorded and they could probably be found with a higher sampling effort, and based on what is known from the ant fauna of France and Spain, some genera can be expected to be richer (e.g. Temnothorax, Camponotus).

== Species ==
Subfamily	Species	Author citation	Image	Ref(s)
Dolichoderinae	Dolichoderus quadripunctatus	(Linnaeus, 1771)		^{C}
Dolichoderinae	Tapinoma erraticum	(Latreille, 1798)		^{A} ^{B} ^{C} ^{E} ^{K}
Dolichoderinae	Tapinoma madeirense	Forel, 1895	—N/a	^{N}
Formicinae	Camponotus aethiops	(Latreille, 1798)		^{C}
Formicinae	Camponotus cruentatus	(Latreille, 1802)		^{C}
Formicinae	Camponotus herculeanus	(Linnaeus, 1758)		^{A} ^{B} ^{E}
Formicinae	Camponotus lateralis	(Olivier, 1792)		^{N}
Formicinae	Camponotus ligniperda	(Latreille, 1802)		^{A} ^{B} ^{C} ^{E} ^{I}
Formicinae	Camponotus piceus	(Leach, 1825)		^{N}
Formicinae	Camponotus truncatus	(Spinola, 1808)		^{C}
Formicinae	Formica decipiens	Bondroit, 1918	—N/a	^{A} ^{B} ^{E}
Formicinae	Formica exsecta	Nylander, 1846		^{N}
Formicinae	Formica foreli	Bondroit, 1918		^{A} ^{B} ^{E}
Formicinae	Formica frontalis	Santschi, 1919	—N/a	^{A} ^{B} ^{E}
Formicinae	Formica fusca	Linnaeus, 1758		^{A} ^{B} ^{C} ^{E} ^{G}
Formicinae	Formica gerardi	Bondroit, 1917	—N/a	^{C}
Formicinae	Formica lemani	Bondroit, 1917	—N/a	^{A} ^{B} ^{E}
Formicinae	Formica lugubris	Zetterstedt, 1838		^{A} ^{B} ^{E} ^{I}
Formicinae	Formica picea	Nylander, 1846		^{A} ^{B} ^{E}
Formicinae	Formica pratensis	Retzius, 1783		^{A} ^{B} ^{E}
Formicinae	Formica pressilabris	Nylander, 1846		^{A} ^{B} ^{E}
Formicinae	Formica rufa	Linnaeus, 1761		^{A} ^{B} ^{E} ^{G}
Formicinae	Formica rufibarbis	Fabricius, 1793		^{A} ^{B} ^{C} ^{E} ^{I}
Formicinae	Formica sanguinea	Latreille, 1798		^{A} ^{B} ^{E}
Formicinae	Lasius alienus	(Förster, 1850)		^{A} ^{B} ^{C} ^{E}
Formicinae	Lasius brunneus	(Latreille, 1798)		^{C} ^{E}
Formicinae	Lasius distinguendus	(Emery, 1916)		^{C} ^{H}
Formicinae	Lasius flavus	(Fabricius, 1782)		^{A} ^{B} ^{E}
Formicinae	Lasius fuliginosus	(Latreille, 1798)		^{E}
Formicinae	Lasius grandis	Forel, 1909	—N/a	^{A} ^{B} ^{C} ^{E} ^{F}
Formicinae	Lasius mixtus	(Nylander, 1846)		^{A} ^{B} ^{C} ^{E}
Formicinae	Lasius niger	(Linnaeus, 1758)		^{I}
Formicinae	Lasius paralienus	Seifert, 1992		^{D} ^{E}
Formicinae	Lasius piliferus	Seifert, 1992	—N/a	^{N}
Formicinae	Lasius platythorax	Seifert, 1991		^{E}
Formicinae	Plagiolepis pygmaea	(Latreille, 1798)		^{C}
Formicinae	Plagiolepis xene	Stärcke, 1936	—N/a	^{C}
Myrmicinae	Aphaenogaster gibbosa	(Latreille, 1798)	—N/a	^{N}
Myrmicinae	Aphaenogaster subterranea	(Latreille, 1798)		^{C}
Myrmicinae	Crematogaster scutellaris	(Olivier, 1791)		^{C}
Myrmicinae	Leptothorax acervorum	(Fabricius, 1793)		^{A} ^{B} ^{E}
Myrmicinae	Leptothorax muscorum	(Nylander, 1846)		^{A} ^{B} ^{E}
Myrmicinae	Messor structor	(Latreille, 1798)		^{C}
Myrmicinae	Myrmecina graminicola	(Latreille, 1802)		^{C}
Myrmicinae	Myrmica lobulicornis	Nylander, 1857		^{A} ^{B} ^{E}
Myrmicinae	Myrmica rubra	(Linnaeus, 1758)		^{A} ^{B} ^{E} ^{J}
Myrmicinae	Myrmica ruginodis	Nylander, 1846		^{A} ^{B} ^{E} ^{I}
Myrmicinae	Myrmica sabuleti	Meinert, 1861		^{A} ^{B} ^{E}
Myrmicinae	Myrmica scabrinodis	Nylander, 1846		^{A} ^{B} ^{E} ^{L}
Myrmicinae	Myrmica schencki	Emery, 1895		^{A} ^{B} ^{E}
Myrmicinae	Myrmica specioides	Bondroit, 1918		^{A} ^{B} ^{C} ^{E}
Myrmicinae	Myrmica spinosior	Santschi, 1931	—N/a	^{C}
Myrmicinae	Myrmica sulcinodis	Nylander, 1846		^{A} ^{B} ^{E}
Myrmicinae	Myrmica wesmaeli	Bondroit, 1918	—N/a	^{A} ^{B} ^{E}
Myrmicinae	Pheidole pallidula	(Nylander, 1849)		^{C}
Myrmicinae	Pyramica tenuipilis	(Emery, 1915)	—N/a	^{C} ^{H}
Myrmicinae	Solenopsis sp.	Westwood, 1840		^{C}
Myrmicinae	Stenamma striatulum	Emery, 1895		^{C} ^{H}
Myrmicinae	Strongylognathus testaceus	(Schenck, 1852)		^{A} ^{B} ^{E}
Myrmicinae	Temnothorax affinis	(Mayr, 1855)		^{A} ^{B} ^{C} ^{E}
Myrmicinae	Temnothorax gredosi	(Espadaler & Collingwood, 1982)	—N/a	^{A} ^{B} ^{E}
Myrmicinae	Temnothorax kraussei	(Emery, 1916)	—N/a	^{C} ^{H}
Myrmicinae	Temnothorax lichtensteini	(Bondroit, 1918)	—N/a	^{N}
Myrmicinae	Temnothorax nadigi	(Kutter, 1925)	—N/a	^{E}
Myrmicinae	Temnothorax niger	(Forel, 1894)	—N/a	^{N}
Myrmicinae	Temnothorax nigriceps	(Mayr, 1855)		^{N}
Myrmicinae	Temnothorax nylanderi	(Förster, 1850)	—N/a	^{A} ^{B} ^{E}
Myrmicinae	Temnothorax parvulus	(Schenck, 1852)		^{E}
Myrmicinae	Temnothorax rabaudi	(Bondroit, 1918)	—N/a	^{C}
Myrmicinae	Temnothorax tuberum	(Fabricius, 1775)		^{A} ^{B} ^{E}
Myrmicinae	Temnothorax unifasciatus	(Latreille, 1798)		^{A} ^{B} ^{C} ^{E}
Myrmicinae	Tetramorium impurum	(Förster, 1850)		^{A} ^{B} ^{C} ^{E} ^{H}
Myrmicinae	Tetramorium pyrenaeicum	Röszler, 1936	—N/a	^{M}
Ponerinae	Hypoponera punctatissima	(Roger, 1859)		^{C} ^{H} (Note: Hypoponera eduardi was misidentified with Hypoponera punctatissima in Espadaler, Pujade-Villar & Bernadou (2008).)
Ponerinae	Ponera coarctata	(Latreille, 1802)		^{C}
