= Temnothorax pilagens =

Scientific classification
- Kingdom: Animalia
- Phylum: Arthropoda
- Class: Insecta
- Order: Hymenoptera
- Family: Formicidae
- Subfamily: Myrmicinae
- Genus: Temnothorax
- Species: T. pilagens

Binomial name
- Temnothorax pilagens Seifert, Kleeberg, Feldmeyer, Pamminger, Jongepier & Foitzik, 2014

Species of ant

Temnothorax pilagens (from Latin: pilare, "to pluck", "plunder", "pillage") is a small Nearctic species of slave-making ant in the subfamily Myrmicinae. It occurs in northeastern United States. It raids the acorn castles of other insects (Temnothorax longispinosus and Temnothorax ambiguous) and captures them as slaves and has been nicknamed the pillage ant.

== Habitat and distribution ==
The species is known from the north-eastern parts of the United States and possibly south-eastern Canada. They live in forests, woodlands and parks. Preferentially wooded sites with little understory, and a high density of suitable nest sites, such as acorns, hickory nuts and sticks. Occurrence is patchy and depends on high density of suitable host populations; so far only known from three sites in the northern US: Niquette Bay State Park (Vermont), E.N. Huyck Preserve (Rensselaerville, New York) and Sleeping Bear Dunes National Lakeshore (Empire, Michigan). In all three populations, Temnothorax pilagens was enslaving Temnothorax longispinosus and Temnothorax ambiguus; many nests with slaves of both host species.

== Slave raids ==
Temnothorax pilagens is an obligatory slave hunter of Temnothorax longispinosus and Temnothorax ambiguus. Raids are performed either by a scout alone or via group recruitment of up to four slavemaking workers forming a raiding column headed by a scout. Slave raids resemble more those of its congener Temnothorax duloticus than that of Protomognathus americanus. This is especially true for the frequent and effective use of the stinger in fights: well-aimed stings from a caudal direction between head and thorax cause paralysis in hosts followed by quick death. Effective sting use is likely facilitated by morphological adaptations, such as strongly developed flexor-muscles in the petiole and postpetiole allowing for easy gaster flexion. Similar behavioural strategies and morphological traits are also found in Temnothorax duloticus, but not in Protomognathus americanus. Hosts attacked by Temnothorax pilagens show little or only delayed flight responses. Occasionally, host workers try to drag slavemakers out of the nest, and only respond aggressively when attacked by them. The low host responsiveness towards invading Temnothorax pilagens indicate reduced or suppressed enemy recognition. Due to their most effective stinging behaviour, Temnothorax pilagens can cause high rates of host casualties (ranging from 5% to 100%). As the high variation in the rate of casualties indicates, raids can be highly aggressive or relatively peaceful; the latter was often found in raids against queenless host nests. Slave-makers do not only take brood from the attacked host nests, but in 6 of the observed 11 raids, they also carry adult host workers back to their nest and integrated them into the slave workforce.
