= P. americanus =

P. americanus may refer to:

- Parus americanus, a bird species in the genus Parus
- Polyprion americanus, a wreckfish species
- Potamogeton americanus, a pondweed species in the genus Potamogeton
- Protomognathus americanus, an insect species
- Pseudopleuronectes americanus, a flounder species

== See also ==
- Americanus (disambiguation)
