= C. spinosus =

C. spinosus may refer to:

- Ceanothus spinosus, the greenbark ceanothus or redheart, a plant species native to southern California and northern Baja California
- Chalepoxenus spinosus, an ant species endemic to Kazakhstan
- Chelidonichthys spinosus, the red gurnard, a fish species

== See also ==
- Spinosus
