= Temnothorax corticalis =

Scientific classification
- Domain: Eukaryota
- Kingdom: Animalia
- Phylum: Arthropoda
- Class: Insecta
- Order: Hymenoptera
- Family: Formicidae
- Subfamily: Myrmicinae
- Genus: Temnothorax
- Species: T. corticalis

Binomial name
- Temnothorax corticalis (Schenck, 1852)

Species of insect

Temnothorax corticalis is a species of ant belonging to the family Formicidae.

Synonym:

- Leptothorax corticalis
