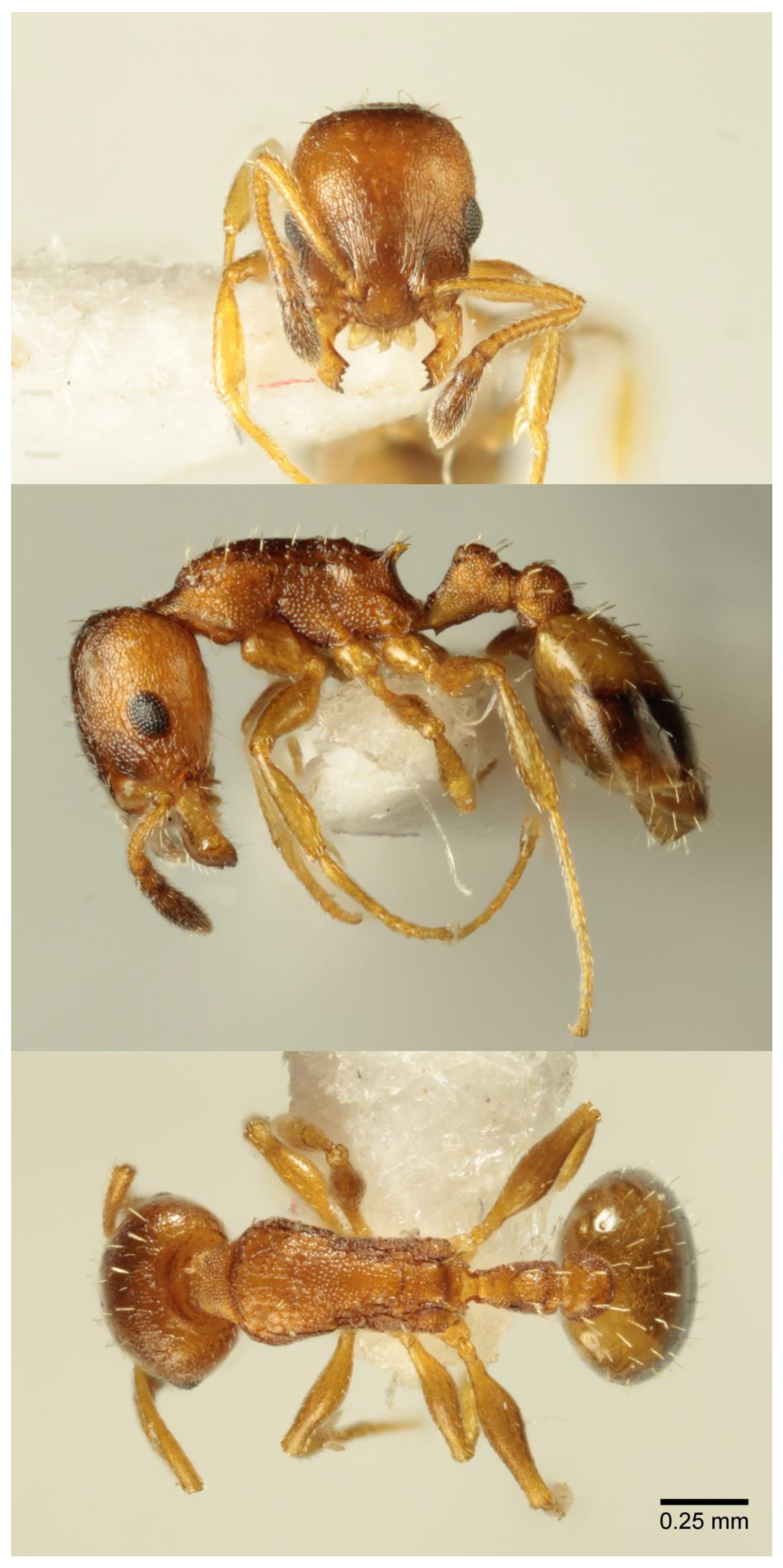

Scientific classification
- Kingdom: Animalia
- Phylum: Arthropoda
- Clade: Pancrustacea
- Class: Insecta
- Order: Hymenoptera
- Family: Formicidae
- Subfamily: Myrmicinae
- Genus: Temnothorax
- Species: T. siculus

Binomial name
- Temnothorax siculus Schifani, Alicata, Prebus & Csősz, 2025

= Temnothorax siculus =

Species of insect

Temnothorax siculus is a species of ant belonging to the family Formicidae. It is a Sicilian endemic as it is not known from outside Sicily.
