= Anomotaenia brevis =

Scientific classification
- Kingdom: Animalia
- Phylum: Platyhelminthes
- Class: Cestoda
- Order: Cyclophyllidea
- Family: Dilepididae
- Genus: Anomotaenia
- Species: A. brevis

Binomial name
- Anomotaenia brevis (Clerc 1902)

Species of flatworm

Anomotaenia brevis is a tapeworm which has been found to be one of many parasite species able to manipulate their host's behavior. Host manipulation is commonly observed in parasites with complex life cycles reliant on multiple hosts for development. While the definitive host for A. brevis is the woodpecker, their intermediate host is the Temnothorax nylanderi, a species of ant located in the oak forests of western Europe. The tapeworm alters the appearance and behavior of the T. nylanderi ant in order to ensure transmission to the woodpecker, where it can complete its life cycle.

The tapeworm affects the behavior, life history, and morphology of the T. nylanderi ant, as well as indirectly affects its uninfected nest-mates. The ant larva is infected after feeding on bird faeces contaminated with A. brevis eggs. The tapeworm penetrates the ant's gut wall and develops into a cysticercoid within the haemocoel. As the parasitic tapeworm larvae develops in the ant's body, the ant begins to change. They smell different from and are smaller than their nest-mates, their cuticles turn yellow instead of the usual brown color, and they tend to stay sitting in the nest. They also have a higher survival rate compared to their uninfected nest-mates, which allows the parasite to have a higher chance at reaching the definitive host.
