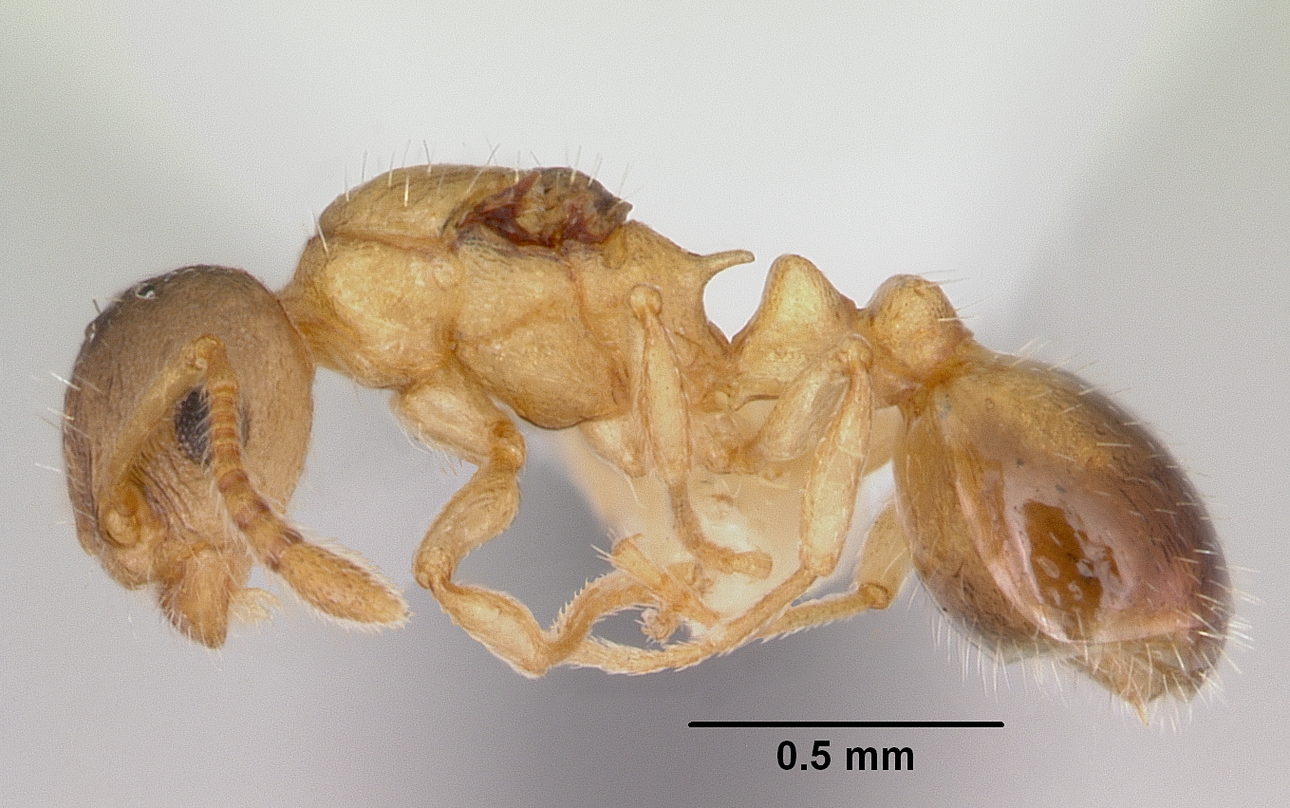
- Temnothorax minutissimus dealate queen

Conservation status
- Vulnerable (IUCN 2.3)

Scientific classification
- Kingdom: Animalia
- Phylum: Arthropoda
- Class: Insecta
- Order: Hymenoptera
- Family: Formicidae
- Subfamily: Myrmicinae
- Genus: Temnothorax
- Species: T. minutissimus

Binomial name
- Temnothorax minutissimus (Smith, 1942)

Synonyms
- Leptothorax minutissimus Smith, 1942

= Temnothorax minutissimus =

Species of ant

Temnothorax minutissimus is a species of ant in the genus Temnothorax. It is native to the United States.
