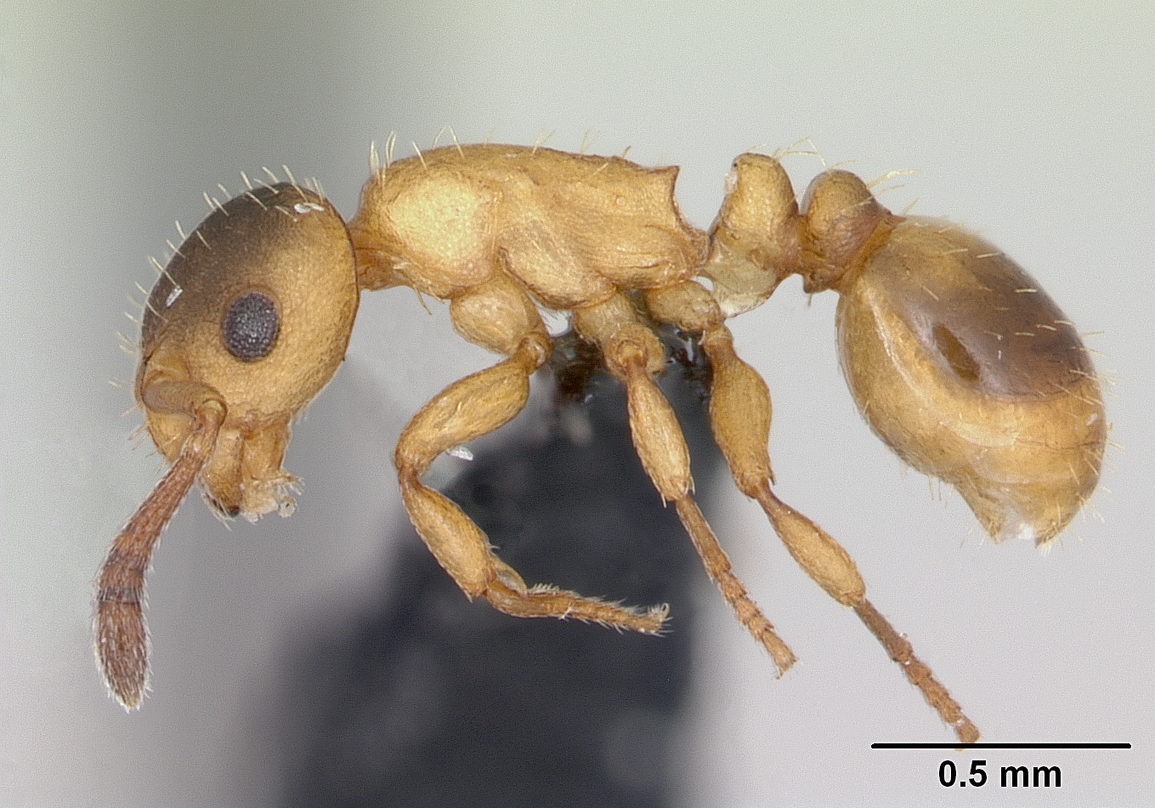
- Worker from Italy

Conservation status
- Vulnerable (IUCN 3.1)

Scientific classification
- Kingdom: Animalia
- Phylum: Arthropoda
- Clade: Pancrustacea
- Class: Insecta
- Order: Hymenoptera
- Family: Formicidae
- Subfamily: Myrmicinae
- Genus: Temnothorax
- Species: T. ravouxi

Binomial name
- Temnothorax ravouxi (André, 1896)

Synonyms
- Myrmoxenus ravouxi (André, 1896); Epimyrma ravouxi (André, 1896)

= Ravoux's slavemaker ant =

Species of ant

Ravoux's slavemaker ant (Temnothorax ravouxi) is a species of slave-making ant endemic to Europe. The species are helotistic, that is, they oppress another species of ant in order to sustain their colony. The queen will fake death to entice ants from another colony to drag her back to their nest, where she awakens and kills the nest's original queen. She will then cover herself in the dead queen's pheromones, and will begin producing eggs. The slavemaker ants then overrun the colony and then find a new colony to take over.

This species was formerly a member of the genus Myrmoxenus, and before that, the genus Epimyrma.
