= Temnothorax zabelini =

Conservation status
- Vulnerable (IUCN 2.3)

Scientific classification
- Kingdom: Animalia
- Phylum: Arthropoda
- Class: Insecta
- Order: Hymenoptera
- Family: Formicidae
- Subfamily: Myrmicinae
- Genus: Temnothorax
- Species: T. zabelini

Binomial name
- Temnothorax zabelini (Radchenko, 1989)

Synonyms
- Chalepoxenus zabelini Radchenko, 1989

Species of ant

Temnothorax zabelini is a species of ant in the genus Temnothorax, that is native to Turkmenistan.
