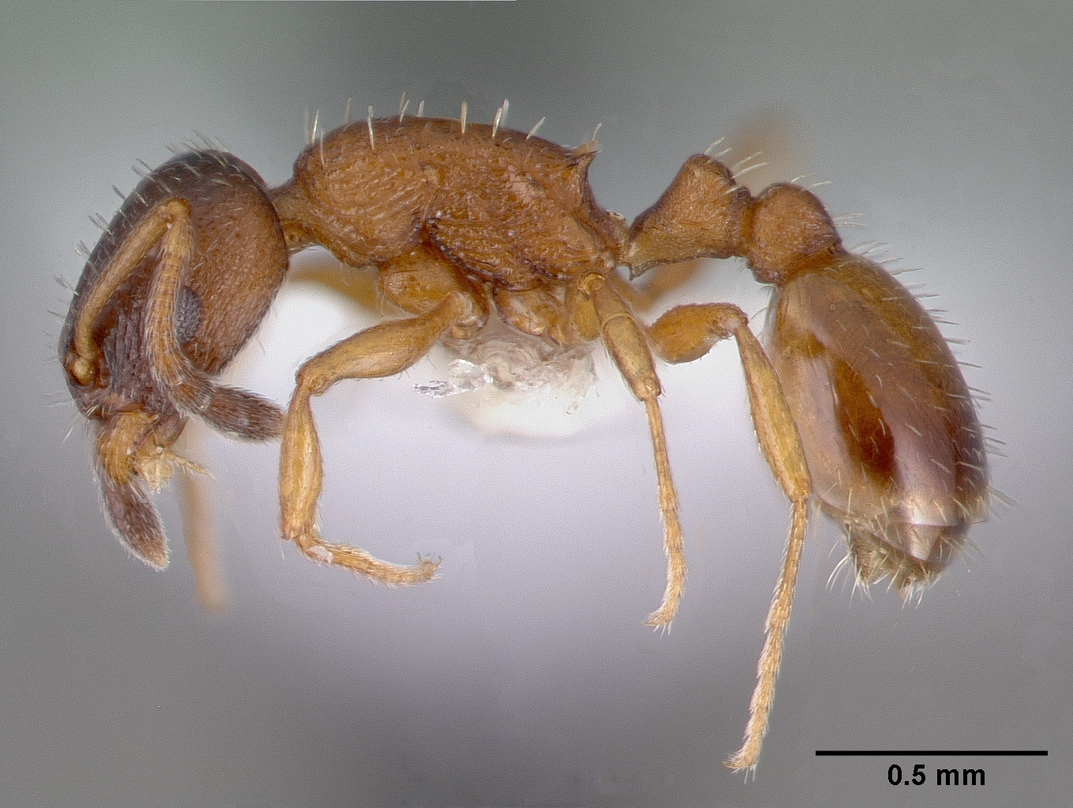

Scientific classification
- Domain: Eukaryota
- Kingdom: Animalia
- Phylum: Arthropoda
- Class: Insecta
- Order: Hymenoptera
- Family: Formicidae
- Subfamily: Myrmicinae
- Genus: Temnothorax
- Species: T. tuberum

Binomial name
- Temnothorax tuberum (Fabricius, 1775)

= Temnothorax tuberum =

Species of insect

Temnothorax tuberum is a species of ant belonging to the family Formicidae.

Synonym:

- Leptothorax tuberum
