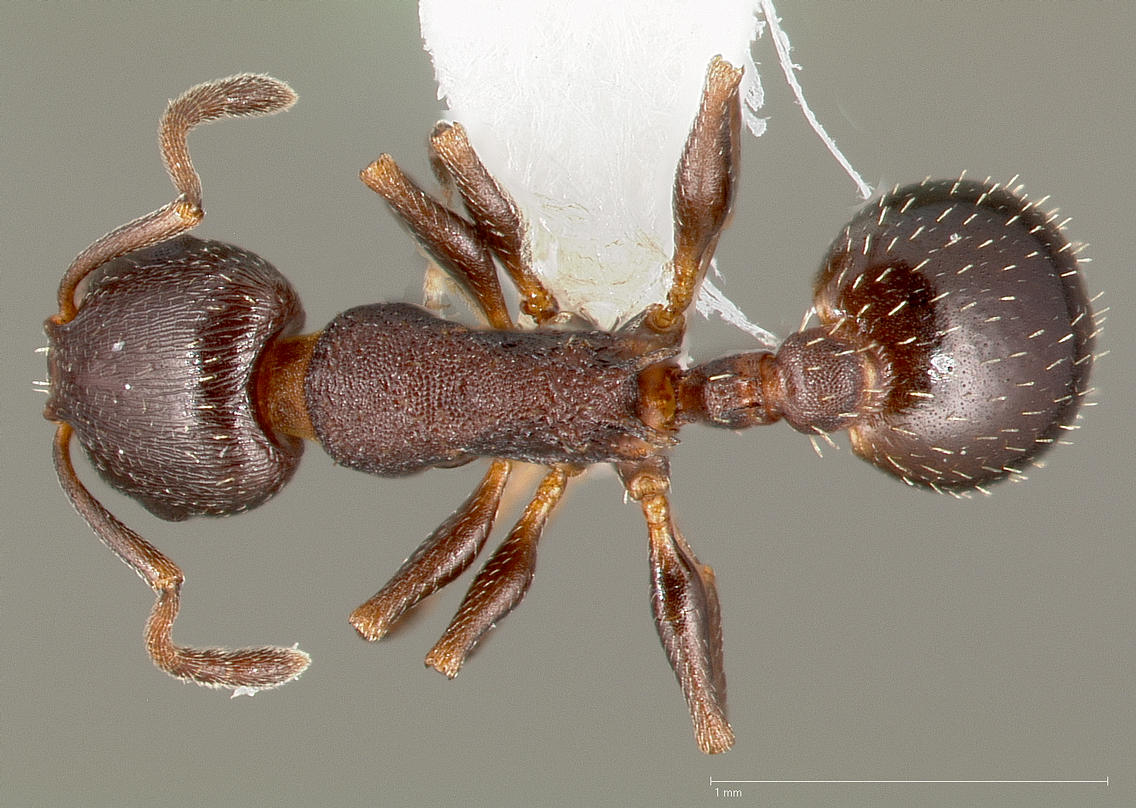

Scientific classification
- Domain: Eukaryota
- Kingdom: Animalia
- Phylum: Arthropoda
- Class: Insecta
- Order: Hymenoptera
- Family: Formicidae
- Subfamily: Myrmicinae
- Genus: Temnothorax
- Species: T. gallae

Binomial name
- Temnothorax gallae M.R.Smith, 1949

= Temnothorax gallae =

Species of ant

Temnothorax gallae is a species of ant in the family Formicidae.

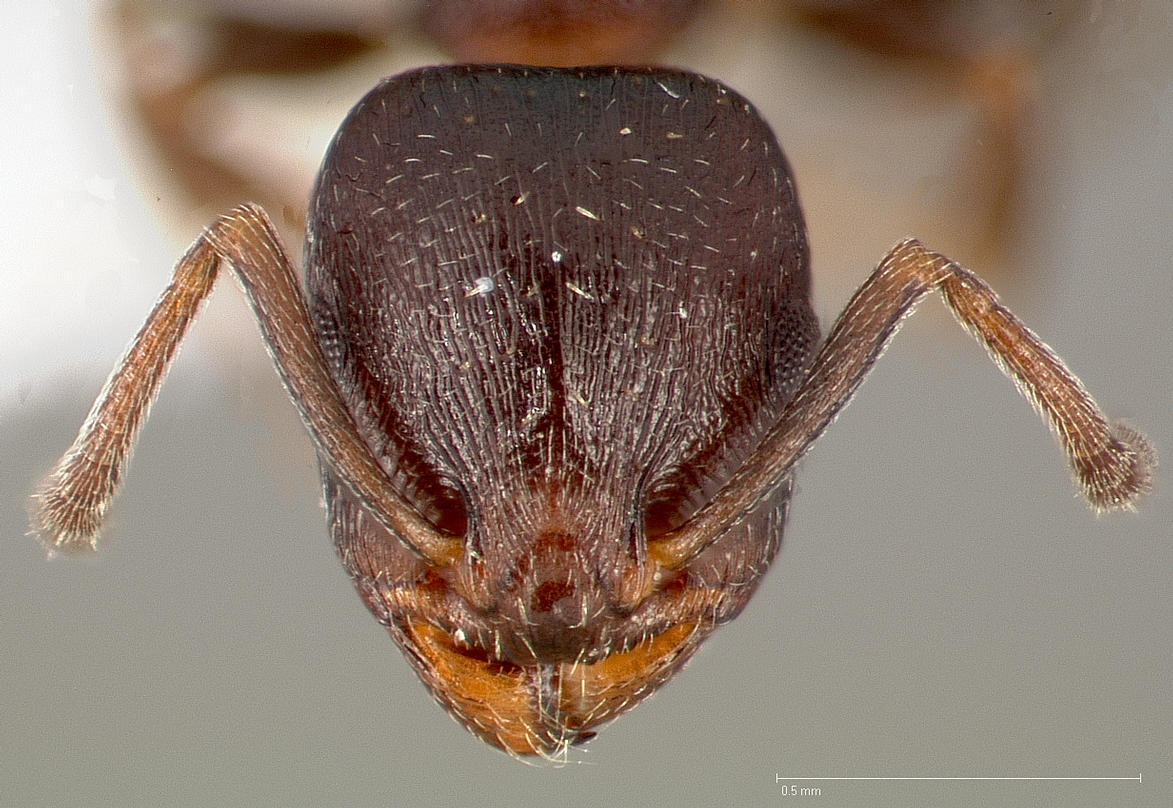

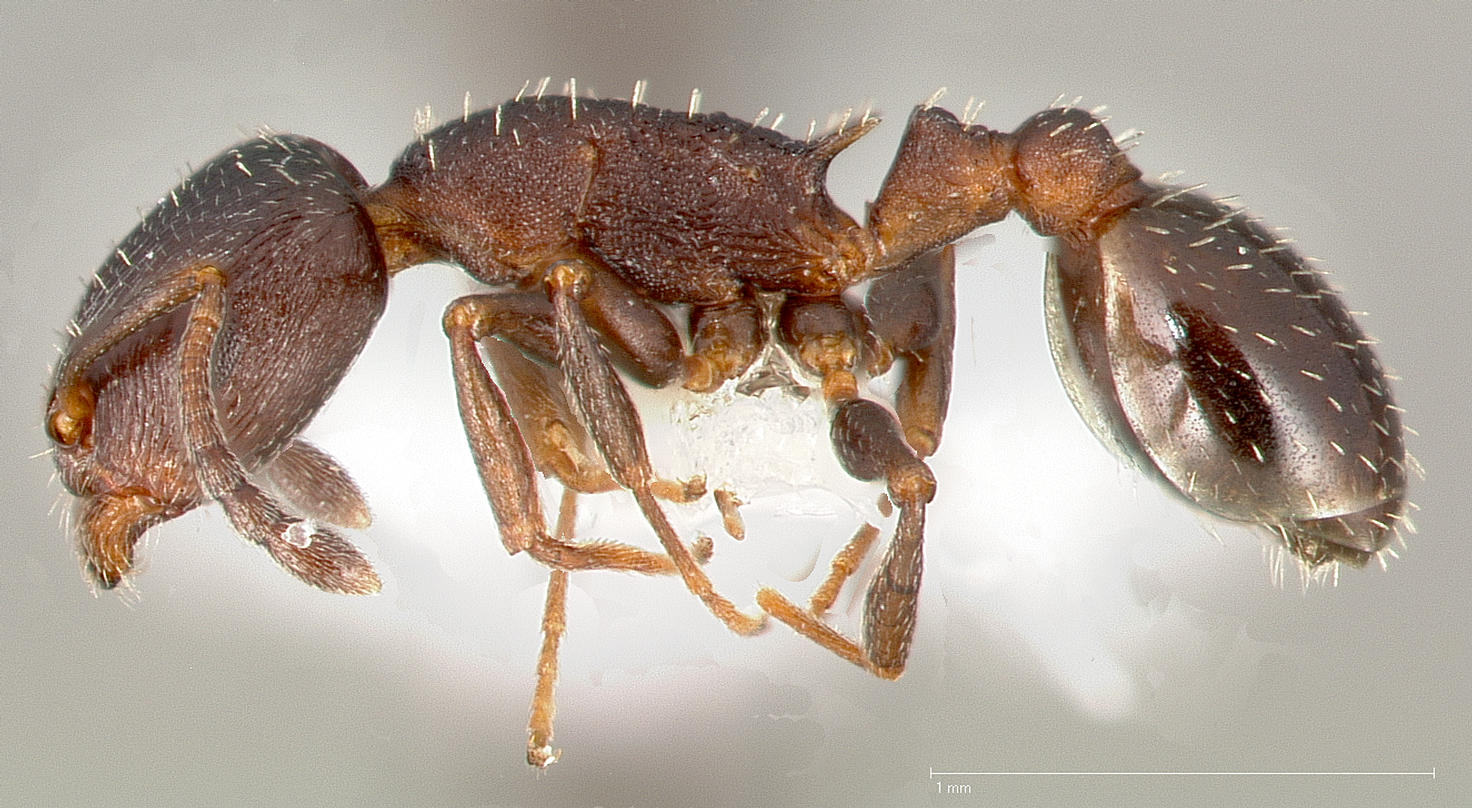
