= Temnothorax kutteri =

Conservation status
- Vulnerable (IUCN 2.3)

Scientific classification
- Domain: Eukaryota
- Kingdom: Animalia
- Phylum: Arthropoda
- Class: Insecta
- Order: Hymenoptera
- Family: Formicidae
- Subfamily: Myrmicinae
- Genus: Temnothorax
- Species: T. kutteri

Binomial name
- Temnothorax kutteri (Cagniant, 1973)

Synonyms
- Chalepoxenus kutteri Cagniant, 1973

Species of ant

Temnothorax kutteri is a species of slave-making ant in the genus Temnothorax. It is native to southern France and eastern Iberia, from the Pyrenees to the Sierra Nevada. The species parasitises other ant species in the genus Temnothorax.
