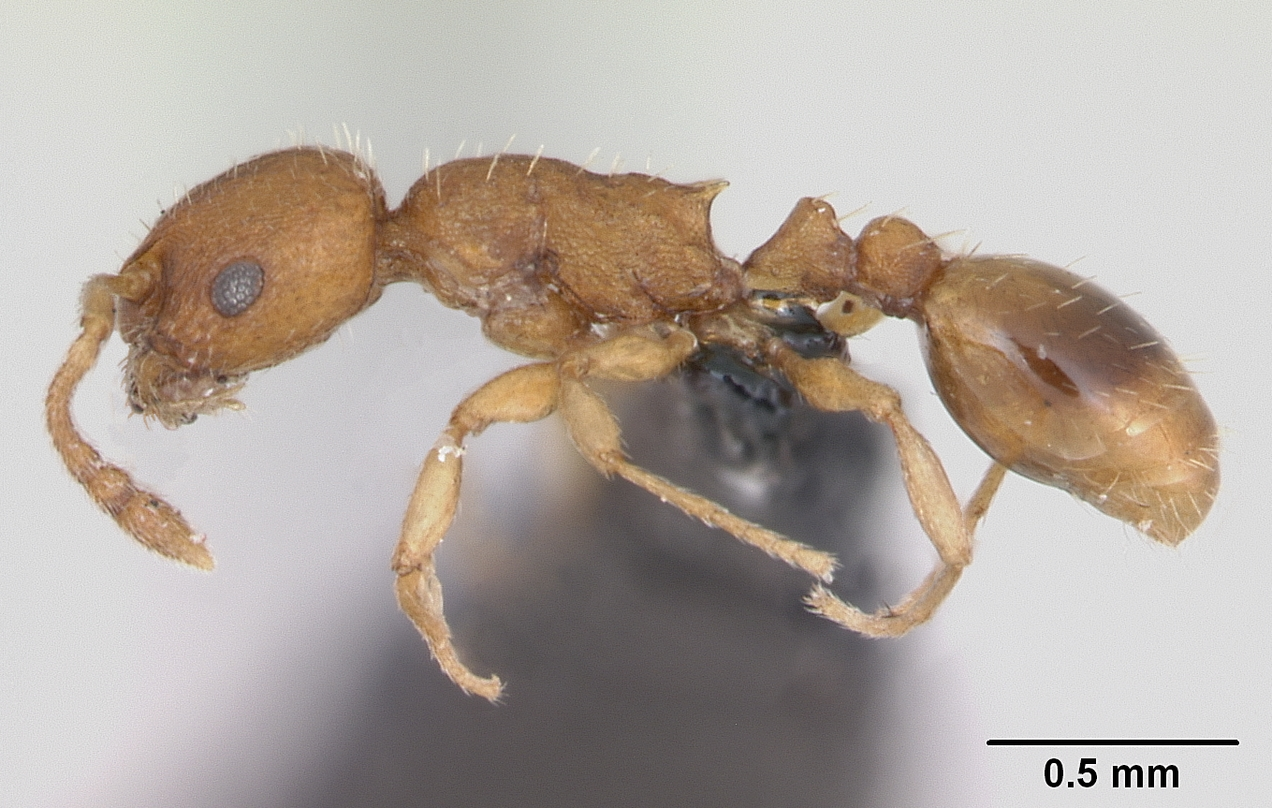

Scientific classification
- Domain: Eukaryota
- Kingdom: Animalia
- Phylum: Arthropoda
- Class: Insecta
- Order: Hymenoptera
- Family: Formicidae
- Subfamily: Myrmicinae
- Genus: Temnothorax
- Species: T. parvulus

Binomial name
- Temnothorax parvulus (Schenck, 1852)

= Temnothorax parvulus =

Species of insect

Temnothorax parvulus is a species of ant belonging to the family Formicidae.
