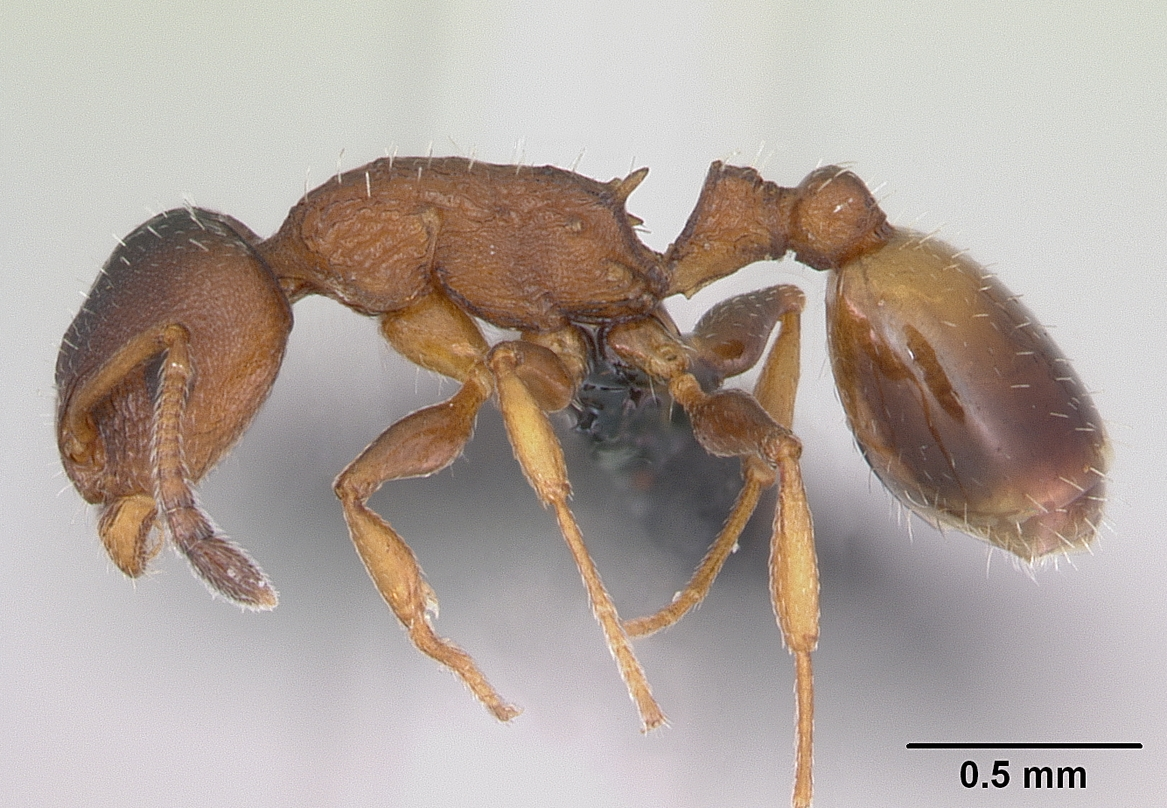

Scientific classification
- Domain: Eukaryota
- Kingdom: Animalia
- Phylum: Arthropoda
- Class: Insecta
- Order: Hymenoptera
- Family: Formicidae
- Subfamily: Myrmicinae
- Genus: Temnothorax
- Species: T. affinis

Binomial name
- Temnothorax affinis (Mayr, 1855)

= Temnothorax affinis =

Species of insect

Temnothorax affinis is a species of ant belonging to the family Formicidae.
