= Temnothorax tarbinskii =

Conservation status
- Vulnerable (IUCN 2.3)

Scientific classification
- Kingdom: Animalia
- Phylum: Arthropoda
- Class: Insecta
- Order: Hymenoptera
- Family: Formicidae
- Subfamily: Myrmicinae
- Genus: Temnothorax
- Species: T. tarbinskii

Binomial name
- Temnothorax tarbinskii (Arnol'di, in Tarbinsky, 1976)

Synonyms
- Chalepoxenus tarbinskii (Arnol'di, in Tarbinsky, 1976)

Species of ant

Temnothorax tarbinskii is a species of ant in the genus Temnothorax, that is native to Kyrgyzstan.
