= Temnothorax tramieri =

Conservation status
- Vulnerable (IUCN 2.3)

Scientific classification
- Kingdom: Animalia
- Phylum: Arthropoda
- Class: Insecta
- Order: Hymenoptera
- Family: Formicidae
- Subfamily: Myrmicinae
- Genus: Temnothorax
- Species: T. tramieri

Binomial name
- Temnothorax tramieri (Cagniant, 1983)

Synonyms
- Chalepoxenus tramieri Cagniant, 1983

Species of ant

Temnothorax tramieri is a species of ant in the genus Temnothorax, that is native to Morocco.
