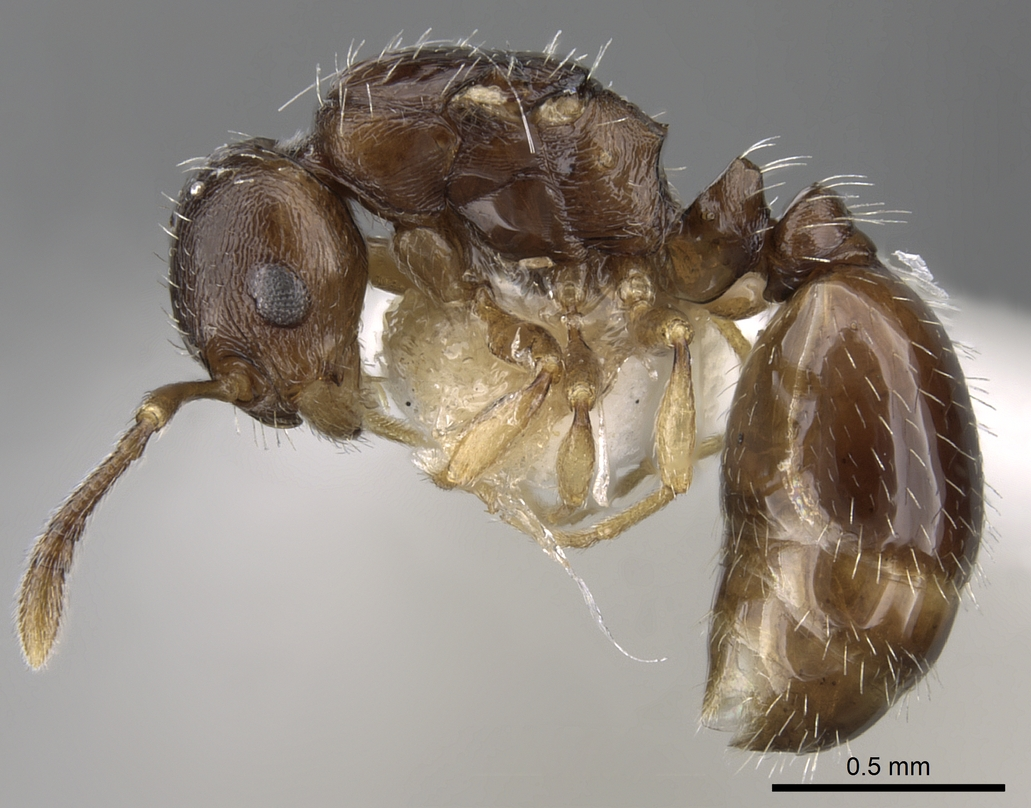

Scientific classification
- Domain: Eukaryota
- Kingdom: Animalia
- Phylum: Arthropoda
- Class: Insecta
- Order: Hymenoptera
- Family: Formicidae
- Subfamily: Myrmicinae
- Genus: Temnothorax
- Species: T. corsicus

Binomial name
- Temnothorax corsicus Emery (1895)

= Temnothorax corsicus =

Species of ant

Temnothorax corsicus is a socially parasitic ant species known from Southern Europe, more specifically from Italy, France and Croatia. It is a workerless social parasite of the ant Temnothorax exilis in the same genus. It is most closely related to Temnothorax adlerzi, a species from Greece with a very similar life cycle.

== Biology ==
Sibling T. corsicus queens and males mate within their natal nest throughout Autumn and remain there until early Spring, when they disperse and infiltrate colonies of Temnothorax exilis. This is a closely related species which T. corsicus takes advantage of to found its colonies. The T. corsicus queen is quickly accepted by the T. exilis worker ants and begins throttling the host queen with the aim of killing it. The throttling can last for several days, until the host queen is left paralized and eventually dies. The parasite is therefore able to lay its own eggs, which are taken care of by the host workers and develop into new T. corsicus males and queens by Autumn the same year. T. corsicus is known as a degenerate slavemaker, as none of the eggs produced by its queens hatch into worker ants. This means that, from the moment the host queen is killed, no new workers can be produced by the colony, and the T. corsicus have to rely entirely on the host workers to survive. Therefore the parasitized colony has a very short life expectancy (~3 years) and is extinguished once the last host workers have died out.
