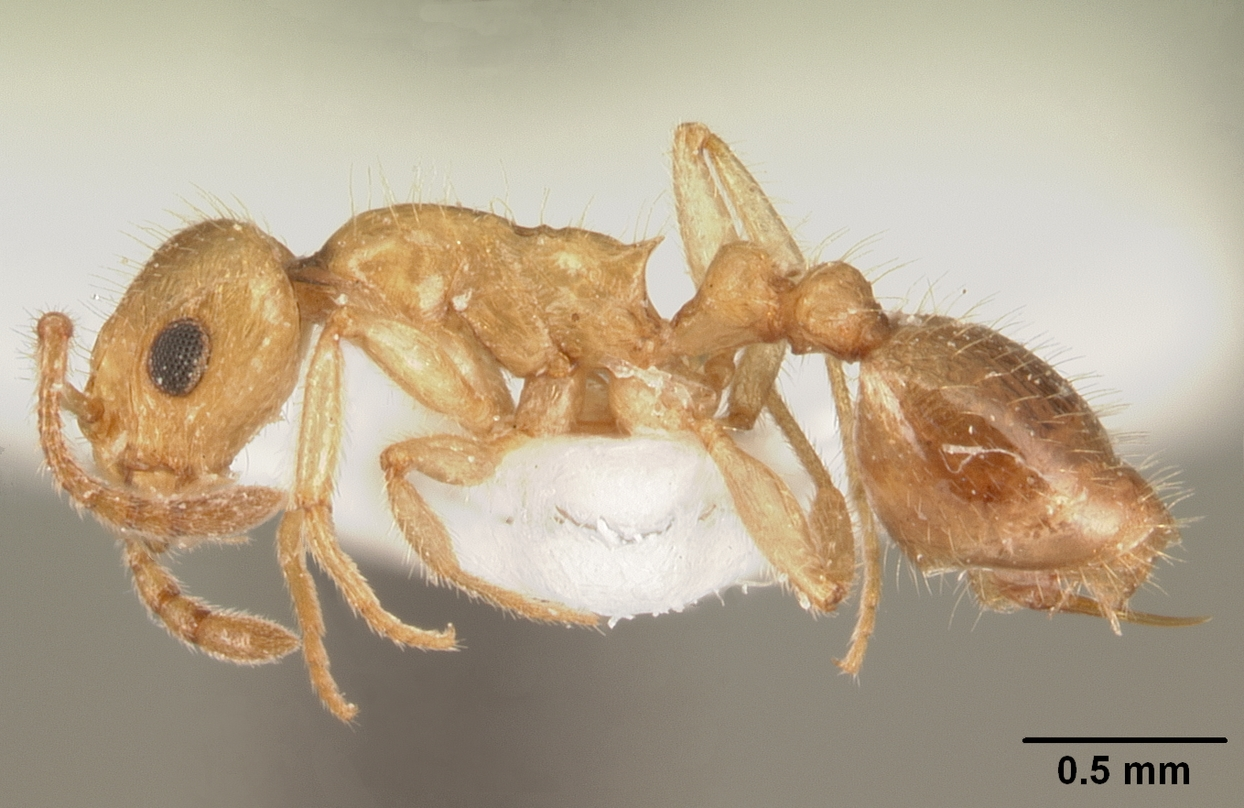
- Temnothorax muellerianus worker

Conservation status
- Vulnerable (IUCN 2.3)

Scientific classification
- Kingdom: Animalia
- Phylum: Arthropoda
- Class: Insecta
- Order: Hymenoptera
- Family: Formicidae
- Subfamily: Myrmicinae
- Genus: Temnothorax
- Species: T. muellerianus

Binomial name
- Temnothorax muellerianus (Finzi, 1922)

Synonyms
- Chalepoxenus muellerianus (Finzi, 1922)

= Temnothorax muellerianus =

Species of ant

Temnothorax muellerianus is a species of ant in the genus Temnothorax.
