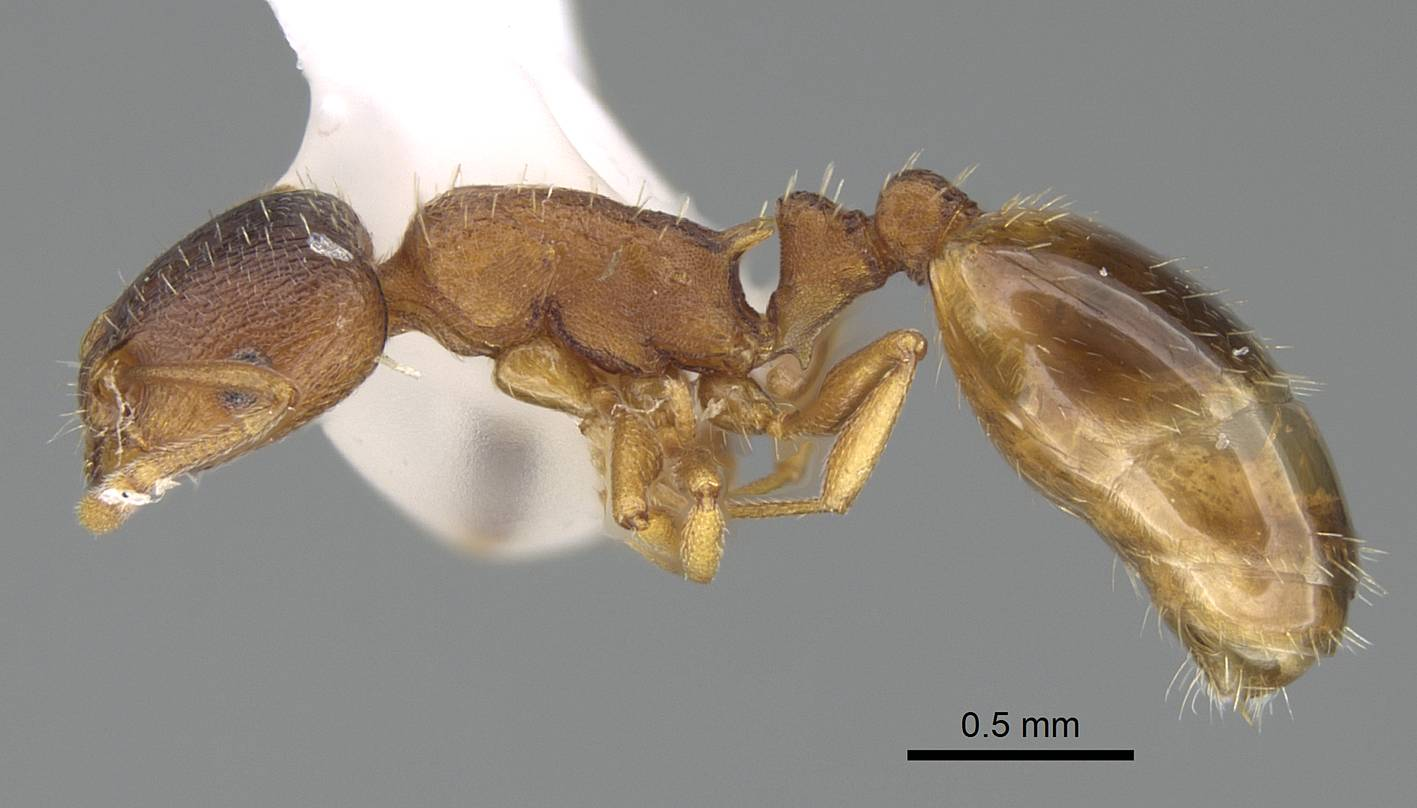

Scientific classification
- Kingdom: Animalia
- Phylum: Arthropoda
- Clade: Pancrustacea
- Class: Insecta
- Order: Hymenoptera
- Family: Formicidae
- Subfamily: Myrmicinae
- Genus: Temnothorax
- Species: T. fragosus

Binomial name
- Temnothorax fragosus Mackay & Buschinger, 2002

Synonyms
- Leptothorax fragosus

= Temnothorax fragosus =

Species of ant

Temnothorax fragosus, also known as the Ragged Divided ant, is a species of ant endemic to Alberta, Canada.
