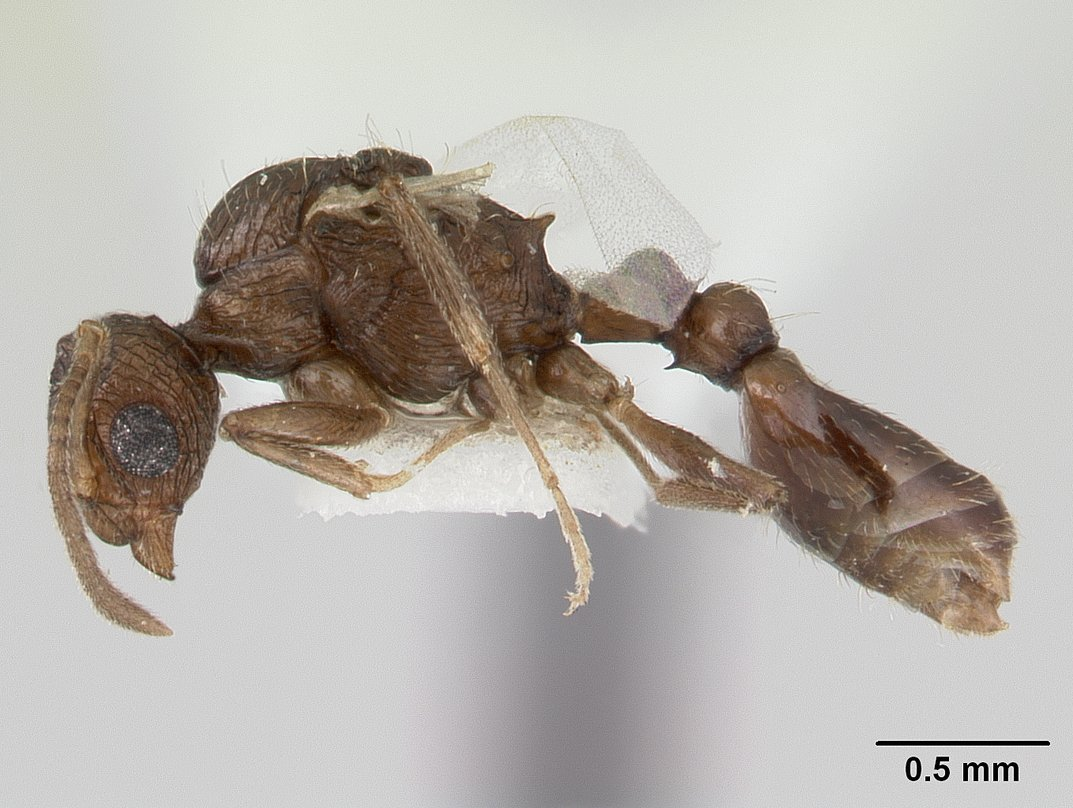
- Temnothorax brunneus queen

Conservation status
- Vulnerable (IUCN 2.3)

Scientific classification
- Kingdom: Animalia
- Phylum: Arthropoda
- Class: Insecta
- Order: Hymenoptera
- Family: Formicidae
- Subfamily: Myrmicinae
- Genus: Temnothorax
- Species: T. brunneus

Binomial name
- Temnothorax brunneus (Cagniant, 1985)

Synonyms
- Chalepoxenus brunneus Cagniant, 1985

= Temnothorax brunneus =

Species of ant

Temnothorax brunneus is a species of ant in genus Temnothorax, that can be found in Algeria and Morocco.
