= Temnothorax lailae =

Scientific classification
- Kingdom: Animalia
- Phylum: Arthropoda
- Class: Insecta
- Order: Hymenoptera
- Family: Formicidae
- Subfamily: Myrmicinae
- Genus: Temnothorax
- Species: T. lailae

Binomial name
- Temnothorax lailae Csősz, Taheri, Schifani, Reyes-López, Alicata, Báthori & Prebus, 2025

Species of ant

Temnothorax lailae is a species of ant in the genus Temnothorax, endemic to Morocco.

== Taxonomy ==
Temnothorax lailae belongs to the Temnothorax anacanthus species complex. The species is distinguished from the closely related Temnothorax anacanthus and Temnothorax hesperius by external morphology and sculptural characters and is not considered a cryptic species.

=== Etymology ===
The species is named in honor of Laila Ajouaou, an ant enthusiast and the wife of researcher Ahmed Taheri.

== Description ==
The body is usually dark brown to black and uniformly colored. A clypeal depression is absent. The central area of the clypeus has a clearly visible areolate surface texture. The mesosoma lacks a metanotal depression and propodeal spines.

In its general appearance, the species resembles Temnothorax anacanthus but differs in coloration and sculpture. The first gastral tergite of Temnothorax anacanthus is imbricate, whereas in Temnothorax lailae it bears strong, longitudinal striation.

== Distribution ==
Temnothorax lailae is endemic to Morocco.
