= Temnothorax inquilinus =

Conservation status
- Vulnerable (IUCN 2.3)

Scientific classification
- Kingdom: Animalia
- Phylum: Arthropoda
- Class: Insecta
- Order: Hymenoptera
- Family: Formicidae
- Subfamily: Myrmicinae
- Genus: Temnothorax
- Species: T. inquilinus

Binomial name
- Temnothorax inquilinus Ward, Brady, Fisher & Schultz (2015)

Synonyms
- Chalepoxenus tauricus Radchenko, 1989

Species of ant

Temnothorax inquilinus is a species of ant in the genus Temnothorax native to Ukraine.

First described as Chalepoxenus tauricus by Radchenko (1989), the species became a secondary junior homonym and given the replacement name Temnothorax inquilinus when Chalepoxenus was synonymized with Temnothorax by Ward et al. (2015).
