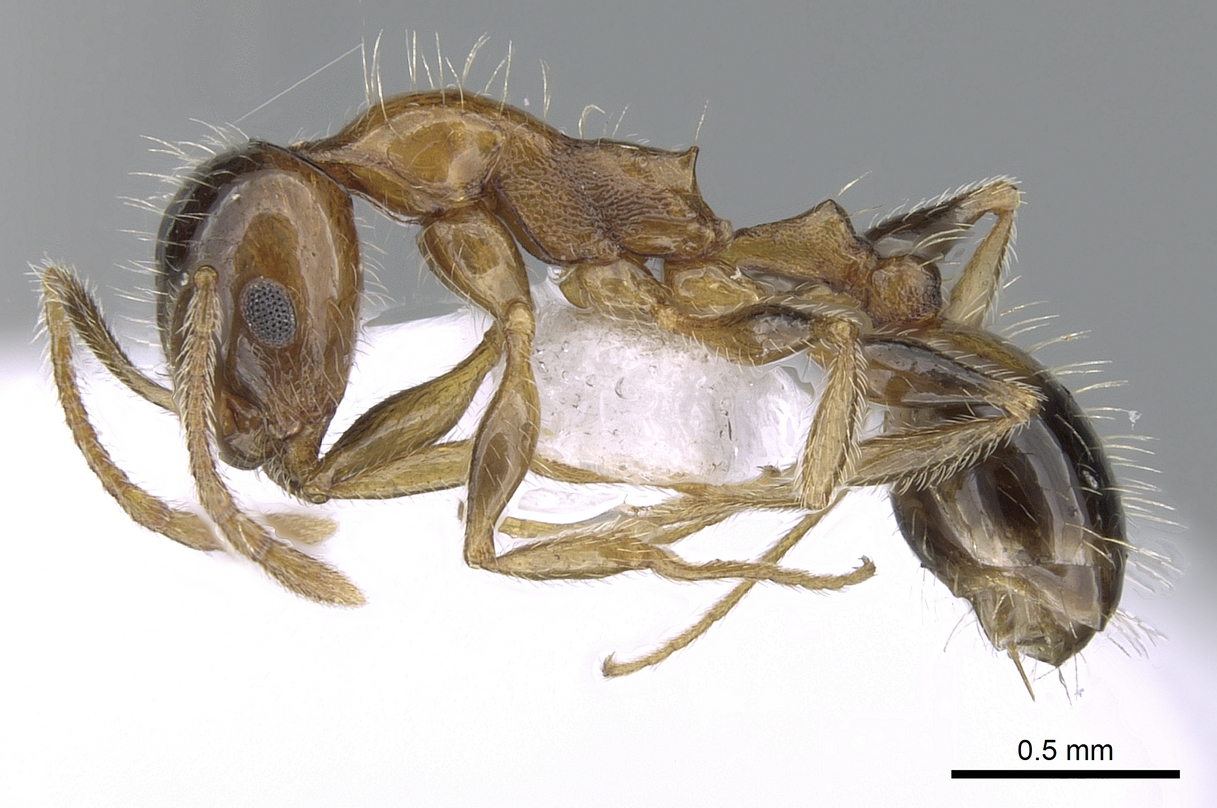

Conservation status
- Least Concern (IUCN 3.1)

Scientific classification
- Kingdom: Animalia
- Phylum: Arthropoda
- Class: Insecta
- Order: Hymenoptera
- Family: Formicidae
- Subfamily: Myrmicinae
- Genus: Temnothorax
- Species: T. recedens

Binomial name
- Temnothorax recedens (Nylander, 1856)

Subspecies
- Temnothorax recedens barbarus Santschi, 1939; Temnothorax recedens recedens (Nylander, 1856)

Synonyms
- Myrmica recedens Nylander, 1856; Leptothorax recedens (Nylander, 1856); Leptothorax ergatogyna Bernard, 1950

= Temnothorax recedens =

Species of ant

Temnothorax recedens is a species of Myrmicine ant found in France, Italy, and Spain, with the most recent discovery in Slovenia.

In his 2003 revision of the family Formicidae, Bolton recognized the genus Temnothorax as valid, with recedens as its type species, after it had been previously placed within the genus Leptothorax.

== Conservation status ==
It is the only IUCN-evaluated hymenopteran species listed as "Least concern", although its status has not been re-evaluated at least since 1996.
