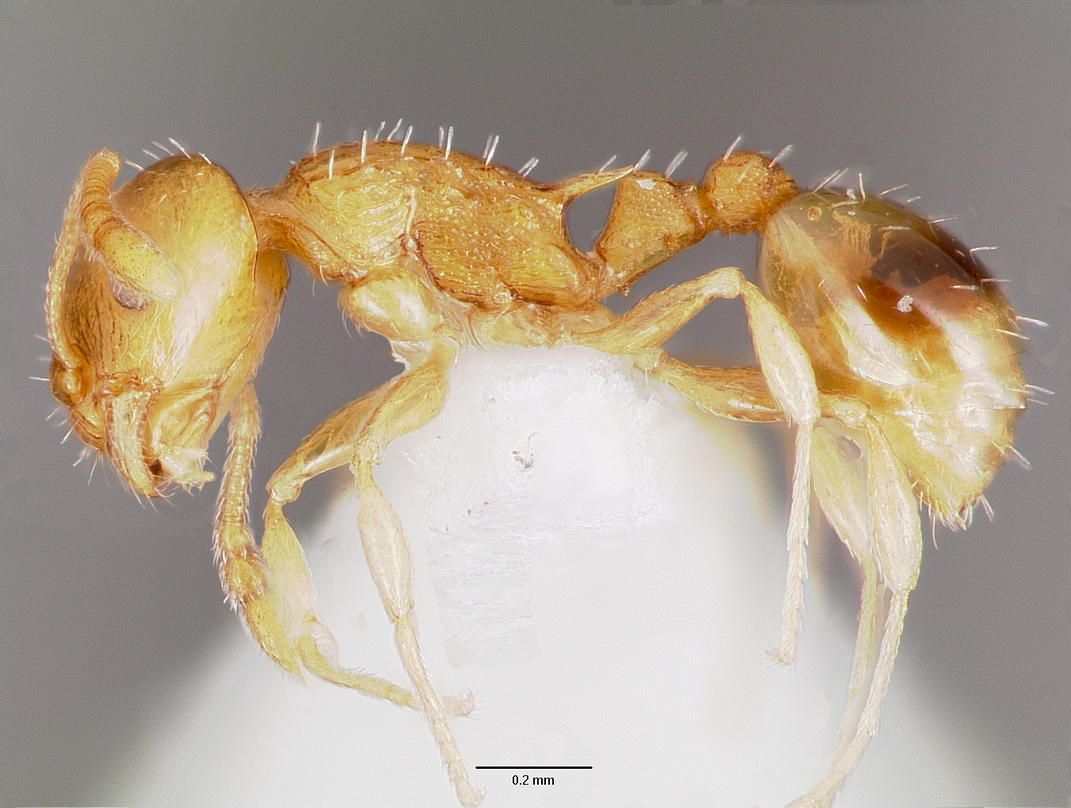
- Temnothorax curvispinosus worker

Scientific classification
- Kingdom: Animalia
- Phylum: Arthropoda
- Class: Insecta
- Order: Hymenoptera
- Family: Formicidae
- Subfamily: Myrmicinae
- Genus: Temnothorax
- Species: T. curvispinosus

Binomial name
- Temnothorax curvispinosus (Mayr, 1866)

= Temnothorax curvispinosus =

Species of ant

Temnothorax curvispinosus, the acorn ant, is a species of ant in the genus Temnothorax. The species is common and widely distributed in eastern United States, where they tend to inhabit forested areas. The ground-dwelling ants build their nests in plant cavities, in the soil or under rocks. It is sometimes called the acorn ant because it can live inside hollowed out acorns.

Acorn ants are found in both rural and urban habitats. The acorn ant is temperature-sensitive, and urban environments tend to be hotter and change temperature more rapidly than rural ones. Urban populations of acorn ants can evolve improved heat tolerance and also increased plasticity in responding to temperature changes.
