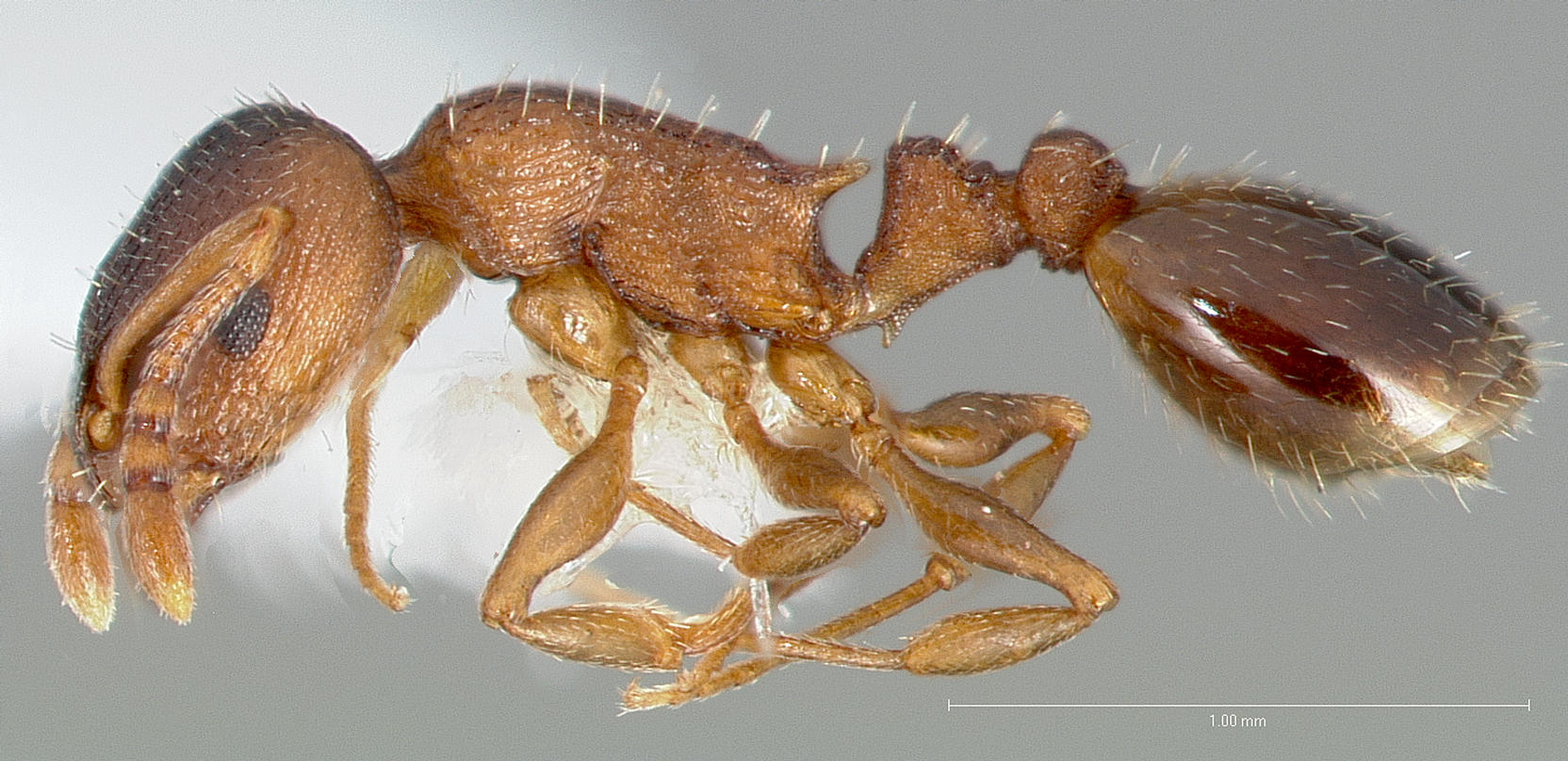
- Temnothorax rugatulus worker

Scientific classification
- Kingdom: Animalia
- Phylum: Arthropoda
- Clade: Pancrustacea
- Class: Insecta
- Order: Hymenoptera
- Family: Formicidae
- Subfamily: Myrmicinae
- Genus: Temnothorax
- Species: T. rugatulus

Binomial name
- Temnothorax rugatulus (Emery, 1895)

= Temnothorax rugatulus =

Species of ant

Temnothorax rugatulus is a species of ant in the genus Temnothorax. It is found in North America. More specifically, it is found in the forests of the western United States. Colonies are either monogynous (with single reproductive queen) or polygynous (multiple queens). Queens in monogynous colonies are generally larger (macrogynes), about twice the size of conspecific workers; polygynous colonies have smaller queens (microgynes), typically slightly smaller than the workers. T. rugatulus ants are a subdominant ant group.

== Behavior ==
=== Quorum decision making ===
Temnothorax rugatulus ants are highly skilled in different consensus methods to help them make decisions. These decisions include where to relocate the nest once it is destroyed or damaged or if their population size has grown too large. In many social insects, individuals known as scouts have the responsibility of searching for resources outside the nesting area. Resources can include a desirable food source or new nesting site. Once ant scouts have gone out and searched for possible nesting sites, T. rugatulus ants use a quorum to establish the better nest site. Sometimes, if a quorum is reached fast enough, several ant groups will split off to multiple sites indicating tension within the colony. Colonies have been known to show preference for certain nest sites. Studies have shown that T. rugatulus ants prefer to stay at the nest site where their queen is (this would occur if part of the colony is separated from the queen), or otherwise dimmed or dark nest sites.

=== Division of labor ===
Division of labor, common in social insects, is exemplified in T. rugatulus in which only a few T. rugatulus scouts will lead an entire colony to a new nesting site. Division of labor can also be seen within the roles of emigration recruitment and food foraging. Ants who are recruiting for an emigration must divide their time in between looking and evaluating a potential new nest site. Food foragers must divide their time in between showing other ants where the food is and being at the rich food source collecting food. In terms of ants labor, these two jobs are independent of one another and will continue regardless of the current situation of the other.

It is generally accepted that T. rugatulus ants are monomorphic, meaning that every individual in the colony has the same approximate body size. However, it was proposed that there is some slight, appreciable difference in body size that may lead to different roles within a colony. It was believed that larger ants traveled farther distances when foraging. When tested, it was found that body size is independent of the foraging distance an ant searches for food. Also, it was found that the colony size of T. rugatulus is independent of foraging distance. It is not fully understood why this behavior occurs.

=== Foraging and defensive dehaviors ===
Colonies in different latitudinal positions show variance in many foraging and threat response behaviors. In northern areas, T. rugatulus ants forage larger distances while southern T. rugatulus ants prefer to travel shorter distances. Also, in response to threat, northern ant colonies tend to deploy less ants (less responsive) but are more aggressive towards invaders, while southern ant colonies send more ants (more responsive) but are less aggressive.

=== Communication ===
T. rugatulus ants use various communication methods to spread information to the entire colony. Tandem running is when one ant has a one-on-one interaction with another ant to a point of interest. Transportation is when one ant literally carries the other ant to the desired location. The newly discovered and studied reverse tandem running is where one ant shows another ant how to get home from an outside location. It may be used in T. rugatulus ants to assist an ant where help is needed instead of showing them to a potential nesting or food site. Another study suggested that it is used as a backup strategy to protect ants emigrating to another nest and convince them of the danger outside and to return home.

T. rugatulus ants also use chemical signaling for communication. Similar taxa of ants related to the T. rugatulus emit a chemical signal from their mandibular gland. This specific chemical's name is 2,5-dimethylpyrazine. Like many chemicals, T. rugatulus use this chemical for different reasons and the context in which the chemical is received by another individual will give it clues as to its current situation. T. rugatulus ants use such chemicals as trail pheromones. The location of the chemical in relation to the nest was extremely important in their behavioral responses. When an alarm signal was presented far away from the nest, the ants were reported to run away from the scent, whereas if the chemical was present just outside their nest, they would run towards it. It is thought that ants may interpret the close alarm signal as a cry for help and attempt to save whoever was emitting the chemical.

=== Navigational behavior ===
For T. rugatulus ants, visual cues help them understand their surroundings and include celestial, local landmarks, or memorization of their surroundings. When presented with a choice of different sensory cues, T. rugatulus steadily chose visual cues over other forms of navigational cues. If and when visual cues were blocked with all else staying equal, the ants were heavily disoriented. The age of the ant also affects the type of navigational cues it uses. Older ants that are more familiar with their surroundings will primarily use visual cues, whereas naive ants will use pheromone signals instead.

=== Starvation behavior ===
When it comes to gathering and storing food, T. rugatulus has no special mechanism. Thus, these ants are very susceptible to the occasional annual starvation. It was found that to provide resistance to starvation, ants used internal resources to keep the brood from dying out. In times of starvation, neither worker nor queen ants sacrifice themselves for the good of the brood. Instead, the population size actually increases because of the young that are being born and raised during the starvation period. Other behavioral changes seen include a reduction in activity and shorter foraging bouts during a starvation period. If starvation goes on long enough, the ants may resort to more extreme measures to acquire food. Dying ants show an increase in activity due to them searching or begging for food from other ants.

=== Laziness ===
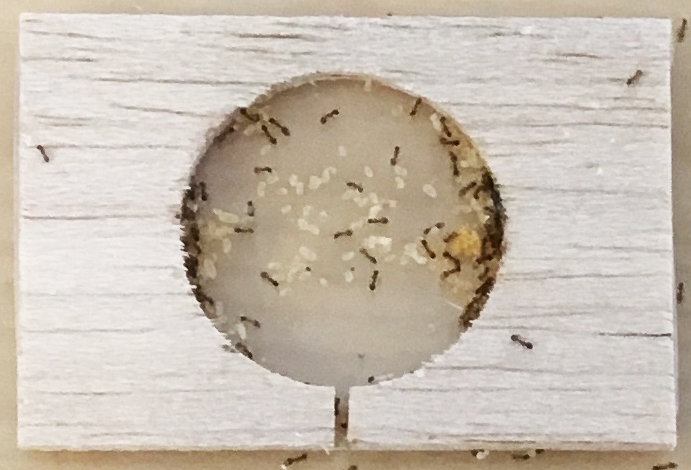
Common laboratory nest setting for Temnothorax rugatulus. Two glass slides sandwich a balsa wood cutout. The ants nest within the cutout and can exit through a small slit (seen at the bottom).

It is known that some of T. rugatulus specializations in colonies include being lazy. Some scientists disputed this as an inaccurate conclusion because T. rugatulus has primarily been studied in the laboratory, where conditions may not reflect their natural habitat. Researchers have found; however, that there is no significant difference in ant activity between laboratory and field observations. It is thought that because ants are exotherms, they are unable to adjust their internal environment to match their activity level like most endotherms do. When they are in a laboratory setting, they are less stimulated than they would be in nature, expressing a seemingly decreased level of activity in a laboratory setting.

== Distribution ==
T. rugatulus is distributed across all of the western U.S.A, North Dakota, South Dakota, and Western Texas. The species has a presence in the northern Mexican states Baja California, Sonora and Chihuahua. The species' range extends north into Canada, occupying the provinces of Saskatchewan, Alberta, British Columbia and the Yukon Territories.
