= Temnothorax sentosus =

Conservation status
- Vulnerable (IUCN 2.3)

Scientific classification
- Kingdom: Animalia
- Phylum: Arthropoda
- Class: Insecta
- Order: Hymenoptera
- Family: Formicidae
- Subfamily: Myrmicinae
- Genus: Temnothorax
- Species: T. sentosus

Binomial name
- Temnothorax sentosus Ward, Brady, Fisher & Schultz, 2015

Synonyms
- Chalepoxenus spinosus (Arnol'di, 1968); Leonomyrma spinosa Arnol'di, 1968

Species of ant

Temnothorax sentosus is a species of ant in the genus Temnothorax, that is native to Kazakhstan.

First described as Leonomyrma spinosa by Arnol'di (1968), and then moved to Chalepoxenus (as Chalepoxenus spinosus), the species became a secondary junior homonym and given the replacement name Temnothorax sentosus when Chalepoxenus was synonymized with Temnothorax by Ward et al. (2015).
