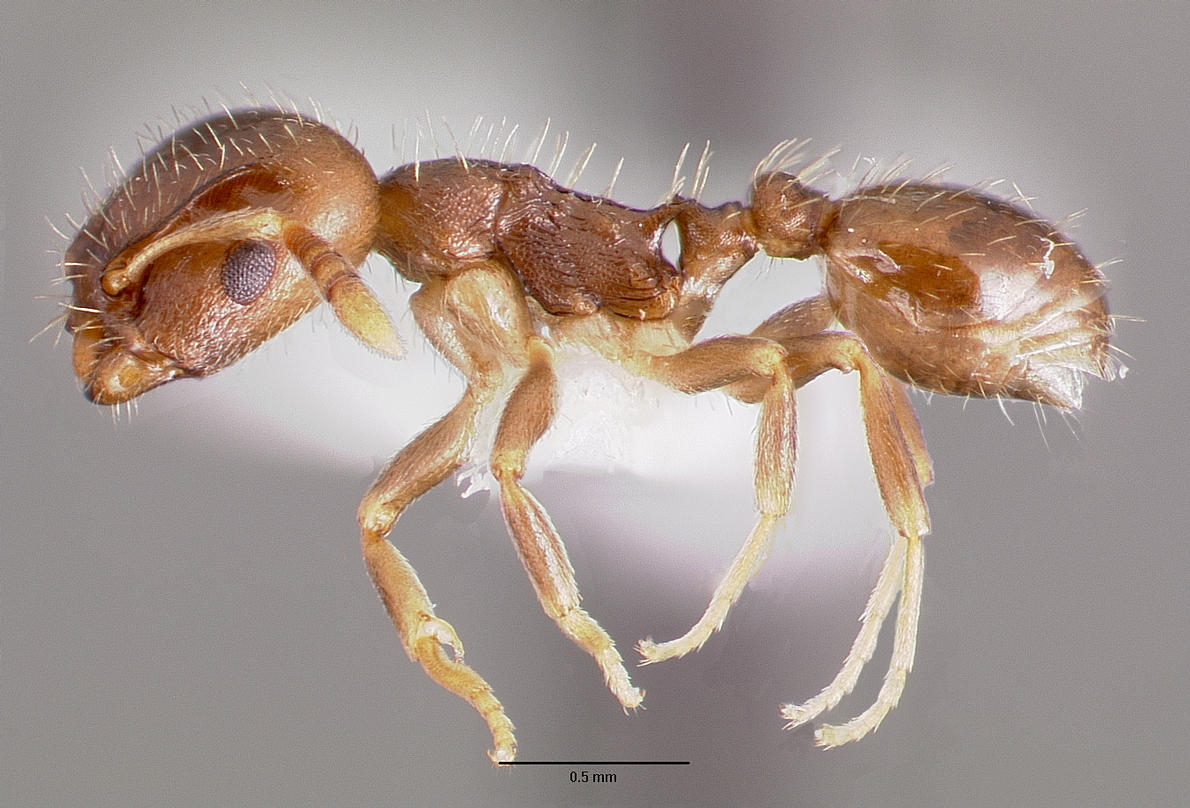
- Temnothorax americanus worker

Conservation status
- Vulnerable (IUCN 2.3)

Scientific classification
- Kingdom: Animalia
- Phylum: Arthropoda
- Class: Insecta
- Order: Hymenoptera
- Family: Formicidae
- Subfamily: Myrmicinae
- Genus: Temnothorax
- Species: T. americanus

Binomial name
- Temnothorax americanus (Emery, 1895)

= Temnothorax americanus =

Species of ant

Temnothorax americanus is a species of slave-maker ant in the genus Temnothorax. The ants are 2–3 mm in size, and endemic to the northeastern United States and adjacent Canadian regions. They do not forage for food, but instead 'scout workers' from the colony seek out nearby host colonies of ants (e.g. Temnothorax longispinosus), steal larvae and bring them back to their own colony. A small T. americanus colony could consist of a queen, two to five workers and thirty to sixty slaves.

In a study published in Animal Behaviour, researchers showed that T. americanus scouts target stronger colonies over weaker ones to steal larvae from.

It was formerly placed as the sole member of the genus Protomognathus.
