= Temnothorax lichtensteini =

Scientific classification
- Domain: Eukaryota
- Kingdom: Animalia
- Phylum: Arthropoda
- Class: Insecta
- Order: Hymenoptera
- Family: Formicidae
- Subfamily: Myrmicinae
- Genus: Temnothorax
- Species: T. lichtensteini

Binomial name
- Temnothorax lichtensteini (Bondroit, 1918)

Species of ant

Temnothorax lichtensteini is a Mediterranean species of ant in the genus Temnothorax.
