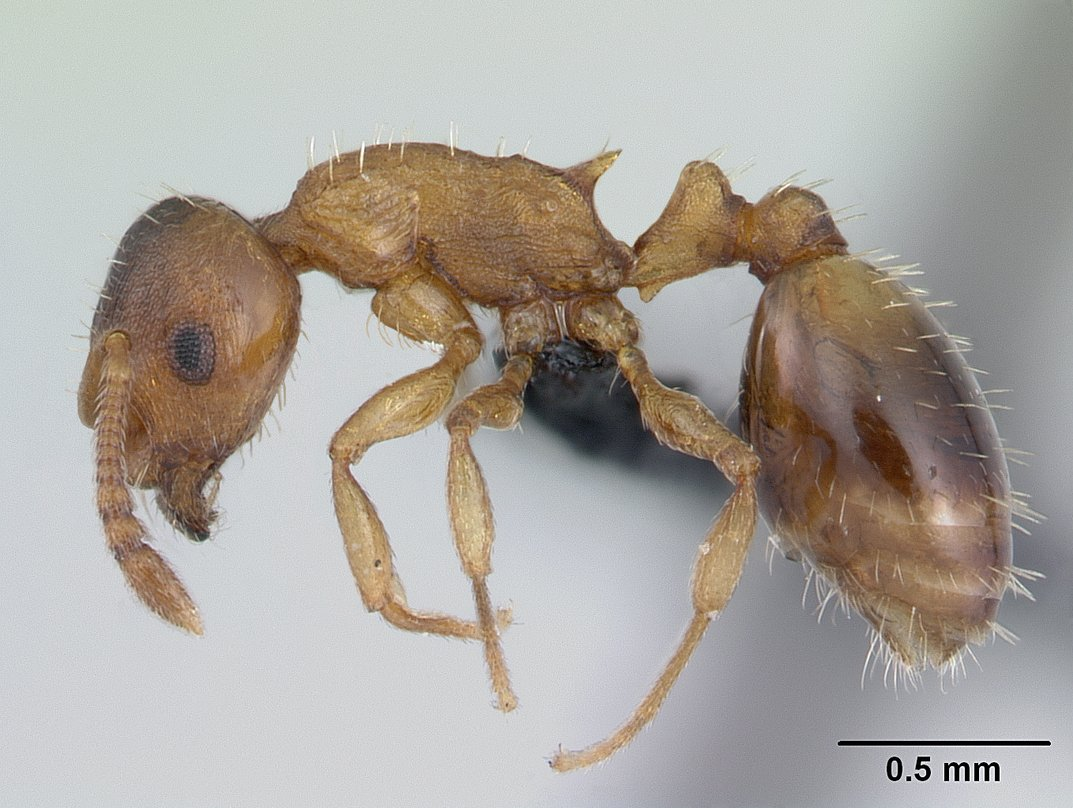
- Temnothorax nylanderi worker

Scientific classification
- Kingdom: Animalia
- Phylum: Arthropoda
- Class: Insecta
- Order: Hymenoptera
- Family: Formicidae
- Subfamily: Myrmicinae
- Genus: Temnothorax
- Species: T. nylanderi

Binomial name
- Temnothorax nylanderi (Foerster, 1850)

= Temnothorax nylanderi =

Species of ant

Temnothorax nylanderi is a species of ant in the genus Temnothorax. The species is found in western Europe. It was first described by Förster (1850) based on a male from Germany.

== Subspecies ==
- Temnothorax nylanderi nylanderonigriceps (Stitz, 1939)

== Ecology ==
Temnothorax nylanderi lives in the litter, and nests can be found in small cavities in twigs and acorns for example. Nests usually contain less than 400 individuals, among them a single queen. Study shows that if these ants live socially isolated, their interaction with their colony members decreases and their stress response changes.

== Repartition ==
Temnothorax nylanderi is widely distributed across Western Europe, and a parapatric species (Temnothorax crassispinus) is found in Eastern Europe. Hybridization can occur between the two species.

== Morphology ==
Temnothorax nylanderi workers are known to have important size variations that do not seem to result from adaptations to their environment, but rather from a lack of canalization during larval development, likely to occur as these ants live in an environment where humidity and temperature can vary greatly. Intercaste individuals that share morphological traits of queens and workers are known to occur frequently. The morphology of these ants can be changed by a parasite, Anomotaenia brevis, that increases the amount of intercaste individuals and induces a change of colors (individuals infected by the cestod are more pale than other individuals).
