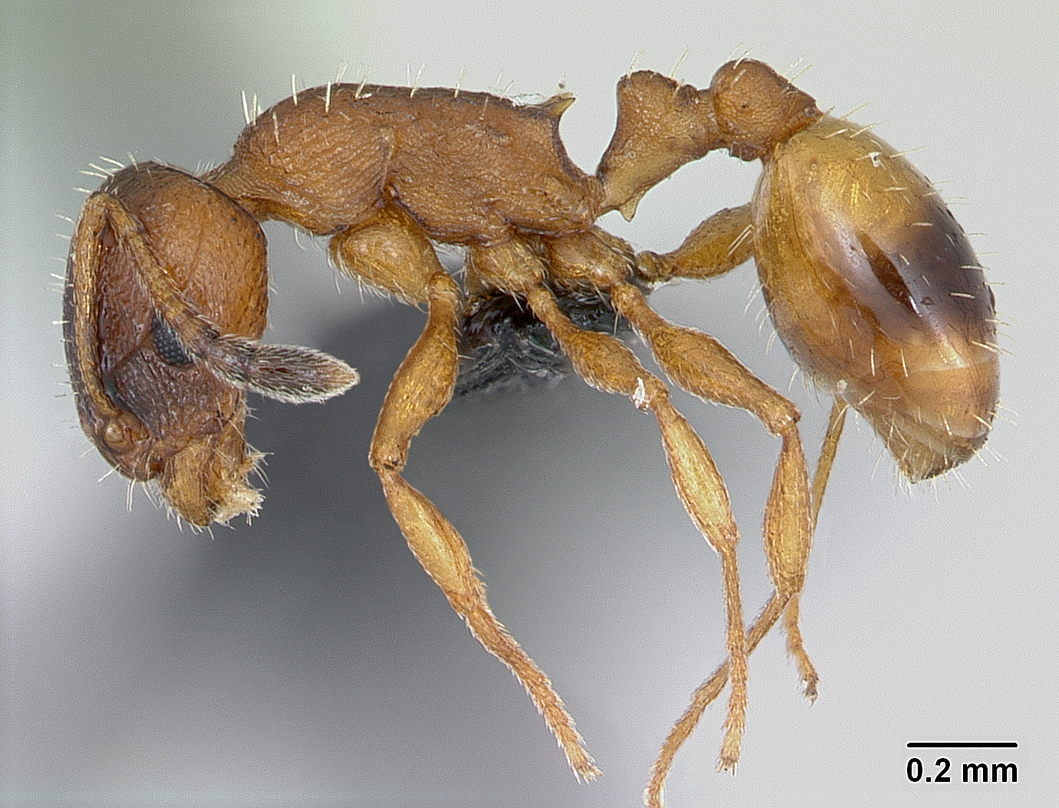
- Temnothorax unifasciatus worker

Scientific classification
- Kingdom: Animalia
- Phylum: Arthropoda
- Class: Insecta
- Order: Hymenoptera
- Family: Formicidae
- Subfamily: Myrmicinae
- Genus: Temnothorax
- Species: T. unifasciatus

Binomial name
- Temnothorax unifasciatus (Latreille, 1798)

= Temnothorax unifasciatus =

Species of ant

Temnothorax unifasciatus is a species of ant in the subfamily Myrmicinae.

== Behavior ==
Temnothorax unifasciatus exhibit the altruistic behavior of social withdrawal, or “altruistic self-removal” whilst on the brink of death. Dying ants will leave their nest hours or in some cases days before their death. The behavior is exhibited both in the presence of fungal infection as well as when experimentally exposed to 95% CO_{2}, causing the ants to die in the absence of an acting pathogen. This indicates that the ants are in fact behaving in an altruistic manner, rather than experiencing behavioral manipulation as a result of pathogen influence. The action is altruistic because it reduces the risk of infecting other ants in the colony. This in turn minimizes the risk of transferring the infection to kin and thus likely results in a higher inclusive fitness for the socially withdrawing individuals.

Ant colonies exhibit altruistic behavior through the suppression of selfish egg-laying behavior on behalf of worker ants by means of “policing;” this is accomplished either through aggression or through direct disposal of the eggs. In a study entitled Policing Effectiveness Depends on Relatedness and Group Size, researchers found the efficacy of colony policing to improve under conditions of decreased relatedness and decreased group size. The effectiveness of policing was shown to decrease in the presence of increase relatedness, because selfish behavior on behalf of kin increases the inclusive fitness of the policers, which presents a disincentive to intervene. The efficacy of policing is also influenced by the relative costs and benefits to the inclusive fitness of the actor engaging in policing behavior. In large colonies, there is less of an incentive to police selfish behavior because the costs associated with intervention outweigh the benefits to the inclusive fitness of the policer. Policing is therefore most likely to be effective in small colonies where there is low relatedness.

T. unifasciatus are susceptible to being taken on as a host-species by parasitic slave-making ants which commandeer brood of other ant species to expand their colony's own work force. Research indicates that the parasitic slave-making ants accomplish the enslavement of the ants through interference during the very early experiences of the potential host ants. T. unifasciatus are thought to use odor to identify fellow nestmates early on in development. By intervening during this stage of development, slave-making ants deceive T. uniasciatus ants into believing they are kin and thereafter do not question their presence. This is supported by a French experiment which presented a comparative analysis of parasitic slave-making species of ants and the species which are vulnerable to becoming hosts; the study found that species susceptible to become hosts were more influenced by interactions early in development than species which were not susceptible to becoming enslaved. Another difference between the species of ants that are susceptible to being enslaved as compared to non-susceptible species was that the species which were not enslaved participated in more social grooming, or allogrooming. Scientists theorize that allogrooming behavior is more common in the slave-making species because they are groomed by the ants they enslave.
