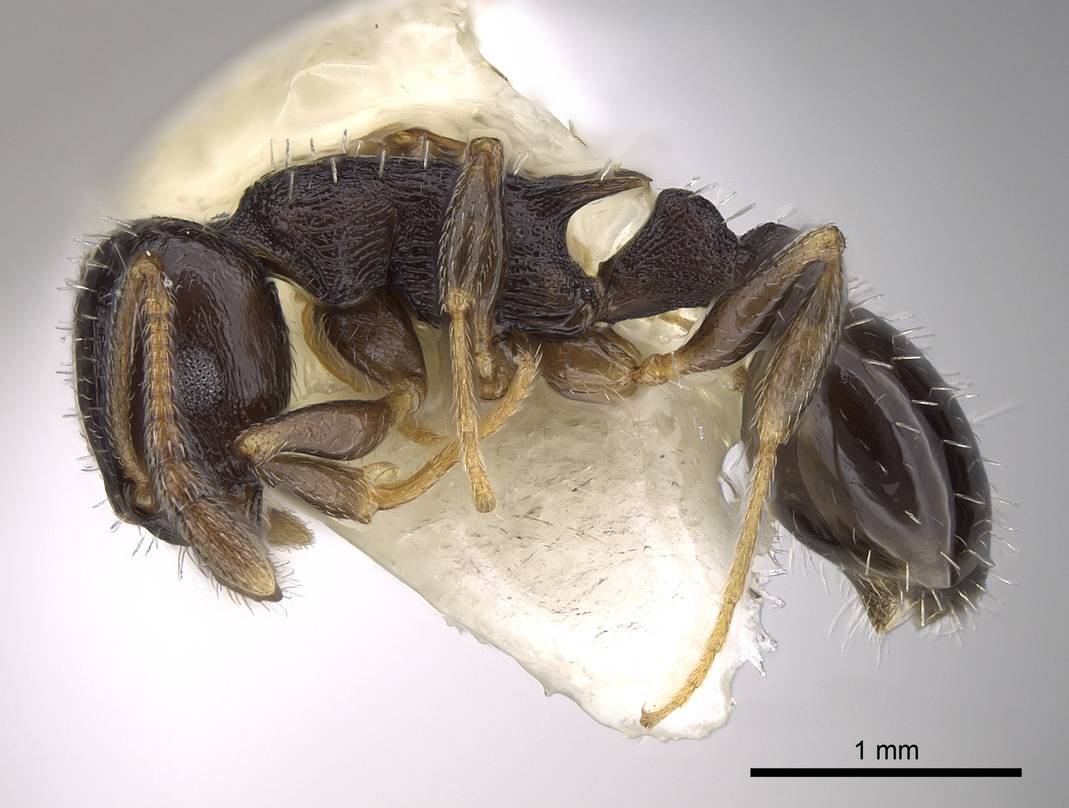
- Worker

Scientific classification
- Kingdom: Animalia
- Phylum: Arthropoda
- Clade: Pancrustacea
- Class: Insecta
- Order: Hymenoptera
- Family: Formicidae
- Subfamily: Myrmicinae
- Genus: Temnothorax
- Species: T. longispinosus

Binomial name
- Temnothorax longispinosus Roger (1863)

= Temnothorax longispinosus =

Species of ant

Temnothorax longispinosus is a species of Temnothorax commonly found in the eastern United States and eastern Canada as well as in British Columbia.

This genus is often adorned with small protrusions from the body towards the gaster and petiole. This species tends to be between 2 and 2.5 mm (0.08 and 0.10 in) in length.

== Habitat ==
Temnothorax longispinosus tends towards forest habitats. Nesting habits change throughout the seasons, but they generally nest in preformed structures within the leaf litter.
