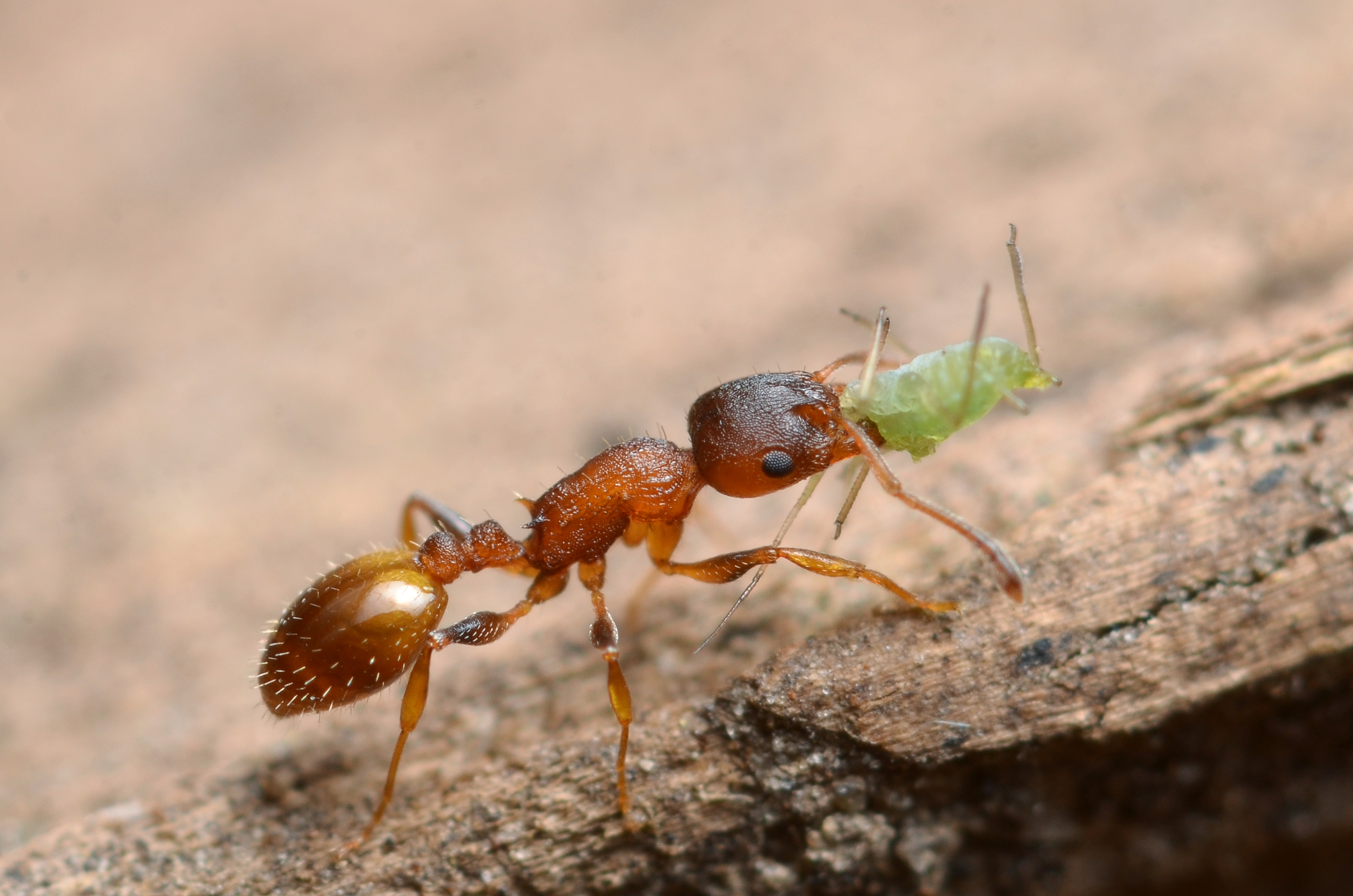
- Temnothorax affinis, Belgium

Scientific classification
- Kingdom: Animalia
- Phylum: Arthropoda
- Clade: Pancrustacea
- Class: Insecta
- Order: Hymenoptera
- Family: Formicidae
- Subfamily: Myrmicinae
- Tribe: Crematogastrini
- Alliance: Formicoxenus genus group
- Genus: Temnothorax; Mayr, 1861

Type species
- Myrmica recedens Nylander, 1856

Diversity
- 514 species

Synonyms
- Antillaemyrmex Mann, 1920; Chalepoxenus Menozzi, 1923; Croesomyrmex Mann, 1920; Dichothorax Emery, 1895; Epimyrma Emery, 1915 (Note: Myrmoxenus (including its junior synonyms Epimyrma and Myrmetaerus) was synonymized under Temnothorax by Ward et al. (2015), but the change was not accepted by Heinze et al. (2015) due to insufficient available data. However, Seifert et al. 2016 resynonymyzed the genus into Temnothorax. Further, if Myrmoxenus were to be its own genus it would be paraphyletic, which is unfavorable in modern taxonomy.); Icothorax Hamann & Klemm, 1967; Leonomyrma Arnol'di, 1968; Macromischa Roger, 1863; Myrafant Smith, M.R., 1950; Myrmammophilus Menozzi, 1925; Myrmetaerus Soudek, 1925; Myrmoxenus Ruzsky, 1902; Protomognathus Wheeler, W.M., 1905

= Temnothorax =

Genus of ants

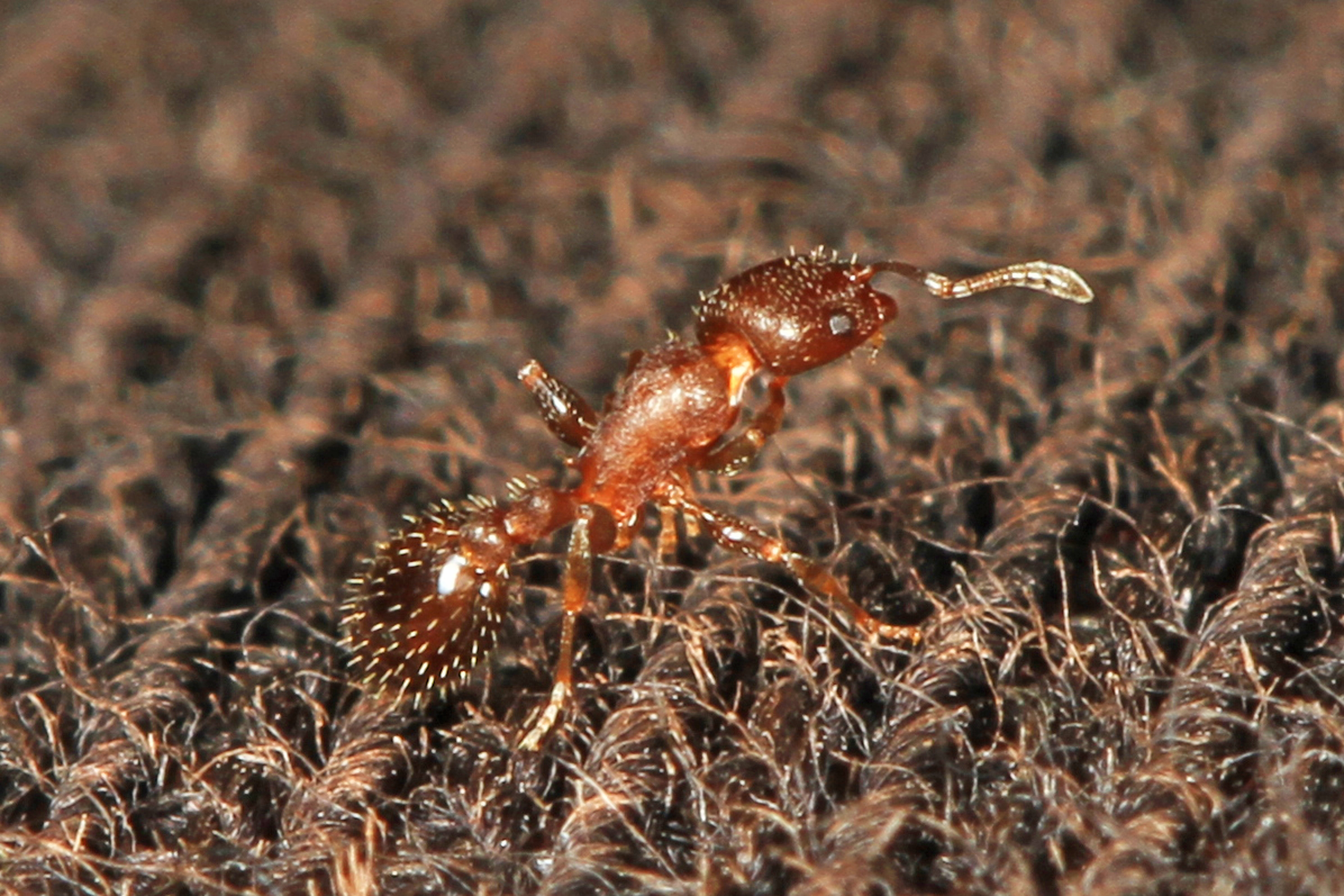
Temnothorax schaumii, Maryland

Temnothorax is a genus of ants in the subfamily Myrmicinae. It contains more than 500 species.

== Biology ==
The workers of Temnothorax species are generally small (mesosoma length 0.715 mm). Colonies are typically monogynous, although facultative polygyny has been documented in several species. Colony populations are usually quite small, often with less than 100 workers. However, several studies have found colonies of some species to be widely dispersed with several to many satellite nests. Many species are arboreal, living within hollow stems, old beetle or termite galleries, or in galls. Temnothorax species appear to be trophic generalists, feeding on a wide variety of scavenged items, including the elaiosomes of seeds. None have been documented to be active or aggressive predators.

== Phylogenetics ==
Recent molecular phylogenetic studies show that the genera Chalepoxenus, Myrmoxenus and Protomognathus are nested within Temnothorax, and that the latter is distinct from the more distantly related genera Formicoxenus, Leptothorax and Harpagoxenus. Species in these 'satellite' genera live as social parasites within the nests of other species of Temnothorax.

== Social behaviors ==
As Temnothorax colonies are small and easy to maintain in a laboratory environment, they are often used to study social behavior in ants.Temnothorax have been used to show displays of social structures through communication, colony responsibility, and influence.

Communication among ants had been observed by biologists and is assumed to be entirely influenced through substrate-bound odor cues. However, this previously determined social factor has been disproved among Temnothorax; a study isolating navigational influences during emigration. This report concluded that this species relies on visual cues and odor cues are simply used to mark territory.

Temnothorax species have been studied to determine the extent of queen control over reproductive decisions of her workers. In one study comparing mixed-species colonies and same-species colonies, queens were not able to completely suppress reproduction of the male workers in mixed-species colonies but could suppress male workers in single-species colonies.

Size of a Temnothorax colony influences the division of labor among workers. By studying 11 colonies of both large and small population sizes (a small colony to consist of 200 to 400 individuals and a large colony to consist of 500 to 700 individuals), the researchers were able to determine how tasks were divided and the proportion of how many workers were active or inactive in the completion of tasks. Seven different tasks are required during the emigration process from an old nest to a new one: scouting, brood transport, adult transport, collection of food (collection of dead Drosophila vinegar flies and collection of honey solution), collection of sand materials for wall building, and the actual task of wall building. The proportion of active workers is usually less than 25% and never more than 50%. The ratio of active and non-active workers remains consistent across colony sizes. Specialization of tasks is also not determined by colony size.

== Species ==
Temnothorax contains over 500 extant valid species as of 2026. Some of them are listed below.

- Temnothorax albipennis
- Temnothorax americanus
- Temnothorax apenninicus
- Temnothorax brunneus
- Temnothorax corsicus
- Temnothorax curvispinosus
- Temnothorax exilis
- Temnothorax fragosus
- Temnothorax gallae
- Temnothorax inquilinus
- Temnothorax kutteri
- Temnothorax lailae
- Temnothorax lichtensteini
- Temnothorax longispinosus
- Temnothorax muellerianus
- Temnothorax nylanderi
- Temnothorax pilagens
- Temnothorax recedens
- Temnothorax rugatulus
- Temnothorax sentosus
- Temnothorax tarbinskii
- Temnothorax texanus
- Temnothorax tramieri
- Temnothorax unifasciatus
- Temnothorax zabelini
