= Anthrax (disambiguation) =

Anthrax is an acute disease caused by the bacterium Bacillus anthracis.

Anthrax may also refer to:

== Organisms ==
- Bacillus anthracis, the bacterium responsible for anthrax, the disease
- Anthrax (fly), a genus of bombyliid flies
- Camponotus anthrax, a species of ant

== Music ==
- Anthrax (American band), an American thrash metal band formed in 1981
  - "Anthrax", a song by the band of the same name from their album Fistful of Metal
- The Anthrax, a music venue in Connecticut, USA (1982–1990)
- Anthrax (British band), a British anarcho-punk band formed in 1980

== Popular culture ==
- Anthrax, a fictional character seen in the video game Shrek SuperSlam
- Anthrax (2001 film), starring David Keith
- Castle Anthrax, a fictional fortress in the movie Monty Python and the Holy Grail

== Other uses ==
- Anthrax toxin, the virulent proteins secreted by Bacillus anthracis
- 2001 anthrax attacks in the US
- Los Ántrax, a Mexican gang
