= Cuauhtémoc (disambiguation) =

Cuauhtémoc was the last Aztec Emperor.

Cuauhtémoc or Ciudad Cuauhtémoc may also refer to:

== Places ==
- Cuauhtémoc, Mexico City, a borough of the Mexican Federal District
- Cuauhtémoc, Colima, Mexico
- Ciudad Cuauhtémoc, Chihuahua, Mexico
- Ciudad Cuauhtémoc, Chiapas, Mexico
- Ciudad Cuauhtémoc, Veracruz, Mexico
- Estadio Cuauhtémoc, a stadium in Puebla, Mexico

=== Rapid transit stations ===
- Cuauhtémoc (Mexibús, Line 3), a BRT station in Chimalhuacán, Mexico
- Cuauhtémoc metro station (Mexico City), a station on the Mexico City Metro
- Cuauhtémoc (Mexico City Metrobús), a BRT station in Mexico City
- Cuauhtémoc metro station (Monterrey), a metro station in Monterrey, Mexico

== People with the given name ==
- Cuauhtémoc Blanco (born 1973), Mexican former football player and politician
- Cuauhtémoc Cárdenas (1934–2026), Mexican politician
- Jose Cuauthemoc "Bill" Melendez (1916–2008), Mexican-American animator

== Other uses ==
- ARM Cuauhtémoc, A naval training vessel of the Mexican Navy; see List of ships named "ARM Cuauhtémoc"
- Cervecería Cuauhtémoc, a Mexican brewing corporation
- Camponotus cuauhtemoc (C. cuauhtemoc), a species of carpenter ant

== See also ==
- Cuauhtémoc Norte (Mexibús), a BRT station in Ecatepec de Morelos, Mexico
- Cuauhtémoc Sur (Mexibús), a BRT station in Ecatepec de Morelos, Mexico
- Cuauhtémoc Municipality (disambiguation)
