= Hylaeus lunicraterius =

Scientific classification
- Kingdom: Animalia
- Phylum: Arthropoda
- Clade: Pancrustacea
- Class: Insecta
- Order: Hymenoptera
- Family: Colletidae
- Genus: Hylaeus
- Species: H. lunicraterius

Binomial name
- Hylaeus lunicraterius Snelling, 1970

North American bee species

Hylaeus lunicraterius is a hymenopteran and member of the Hylaeus genus, or yellow-faced bees. This species has been solely recorded at the Craters of the Moon National Monument found in Idaho, and is endemic to this location.

A holotype of H. lunicraterius was caught and preserved on August 21, 1964. This specimen is preserved in the Los Angeles County Museum entomology collection.

== Life history ==
Hylaeus lunicraterius has a flight season from July to August. It is believed to be a generalist forager, and has been observed foraging from Phacelia species, Eriogonum species, and members of the Compositae family, such as Ericameria nauseosa. It is known to be a pollinator of mouse buckwheat (Eriogonum nudum var. murinum).

=== Nesting biology ===
Little is known about nesting biology of this species. The Hylaeus genus is characterised by nesting in uninhabited beetle holes and dead wood, but is suspected to utilize crevices in lava flows as well.
