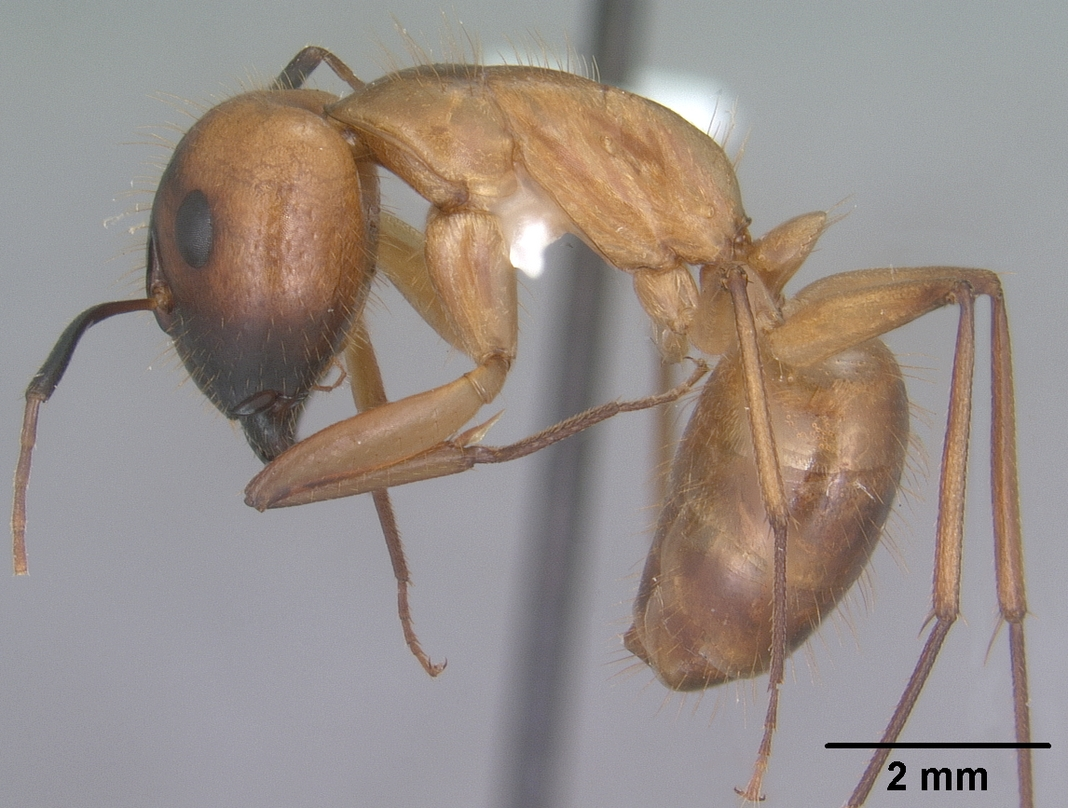
- Camponotus festinatus worker

Scientific classification
- Kingdom: Animalia
- Phylum: Arthropoda
- Clade: Pancrustacea
- Class: Insecta
- Order: Hymenoptera
- Family: Formicidae
- Subfamily: Formicinae
- Genus: Camponotus
- Subgenus: Tanaemyrmex
- Species: C. festinatus

Binomial name
- Camponotus festinatus (Buckley, 1866)

Synonyms
- Formica festinata Buckley, 1866

= Camponotus festinatus =

Species of American carpenter ant

Camponotus festinatus is a species of carpenter ant that is typically found in the Southwestern United States and northern reaches of Mexico. It is most commonly found around Tucson, Arizona. It lives in the semi-dead branches of palo verde trees found in the area. Camponotus festinatus is an exclusively liquid feeder. These ants can only feed on sap from trees or the juices of a deceased animal. Like most ants, their diet is primarily sugar with some protein. Camponotus festinatus ants are not known to be aggressive except towards other ants. Soldiers will prefer to run from humans rather than be aggressive. In principle, these ants can bite with their mandibles. However, as carpenter ants like these are formicines, they have no functional sting. Instead of stinging, they can use an acidopore to spray formic acid.

C. festinatus queens are 'claustral foundresses', in that they sequester themselves in a chamber to begin a new colony and raise the first set of worker ants without seeking out or obtaining additional food.

According to Snelling (2006), C. festinatus was a difficult-to-categorize species complex that "displayed a bewildering array of variant forms" over its vast native range. The paper described two new possible undescribed subspecies of C. festinatus, split two new species off from it, Camponotus absquatulator and Camponotus microps, and revived Camponotus pudorosus and Camponotus fragilis from synonymy.
