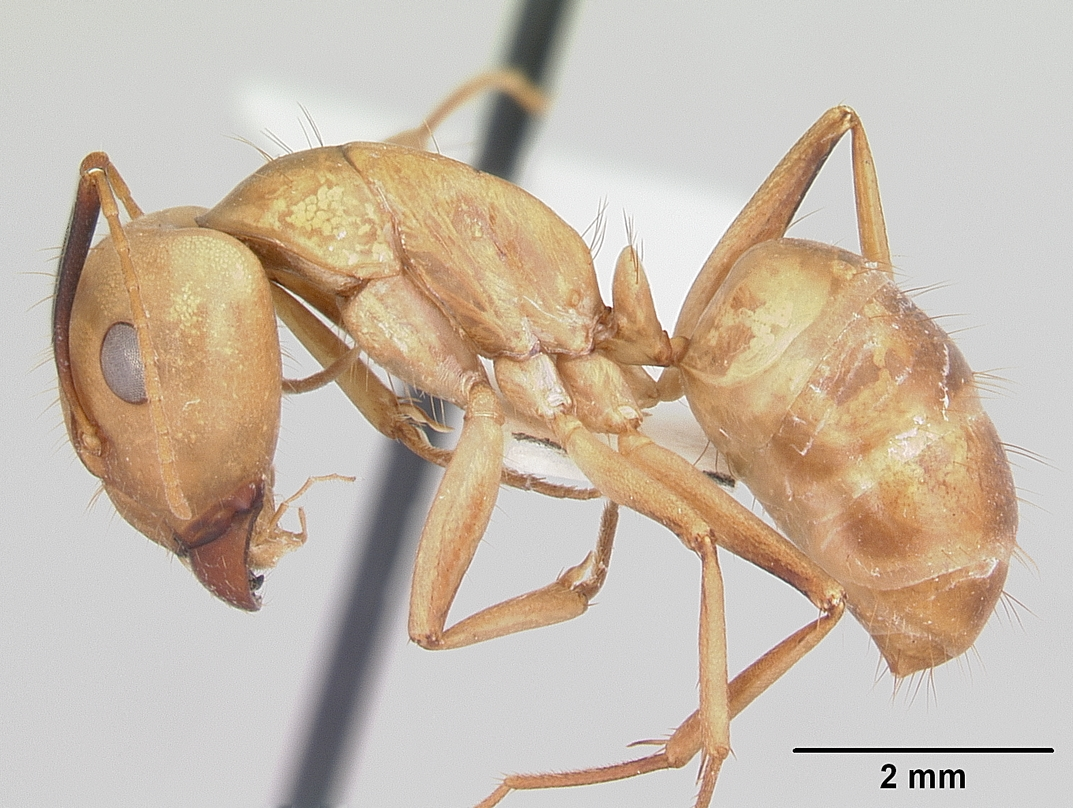

Scientific classification
- Domain: Eukaryota
- Kingdom: Animalia
- Phylum: Arthropoda
- Class: Insecta
- Order: Hymenoptera
- Family: Formicidae
- Subfamily: Formicinae
- Genus: Camponotus
- Subgenus: Tanaemyrmex
- Species: C. absquatulator

Binomial name
- Camponotus absquatulator Snelling, R.R., 2006

= Camponotus absquatulator =

Species of ant

Camponotus absquatulator is a species of carpenter ant native to California, Nevada, and Baja California. It was separated from the Camponotus festinatus complex in 2006 by Roy Snelling.
