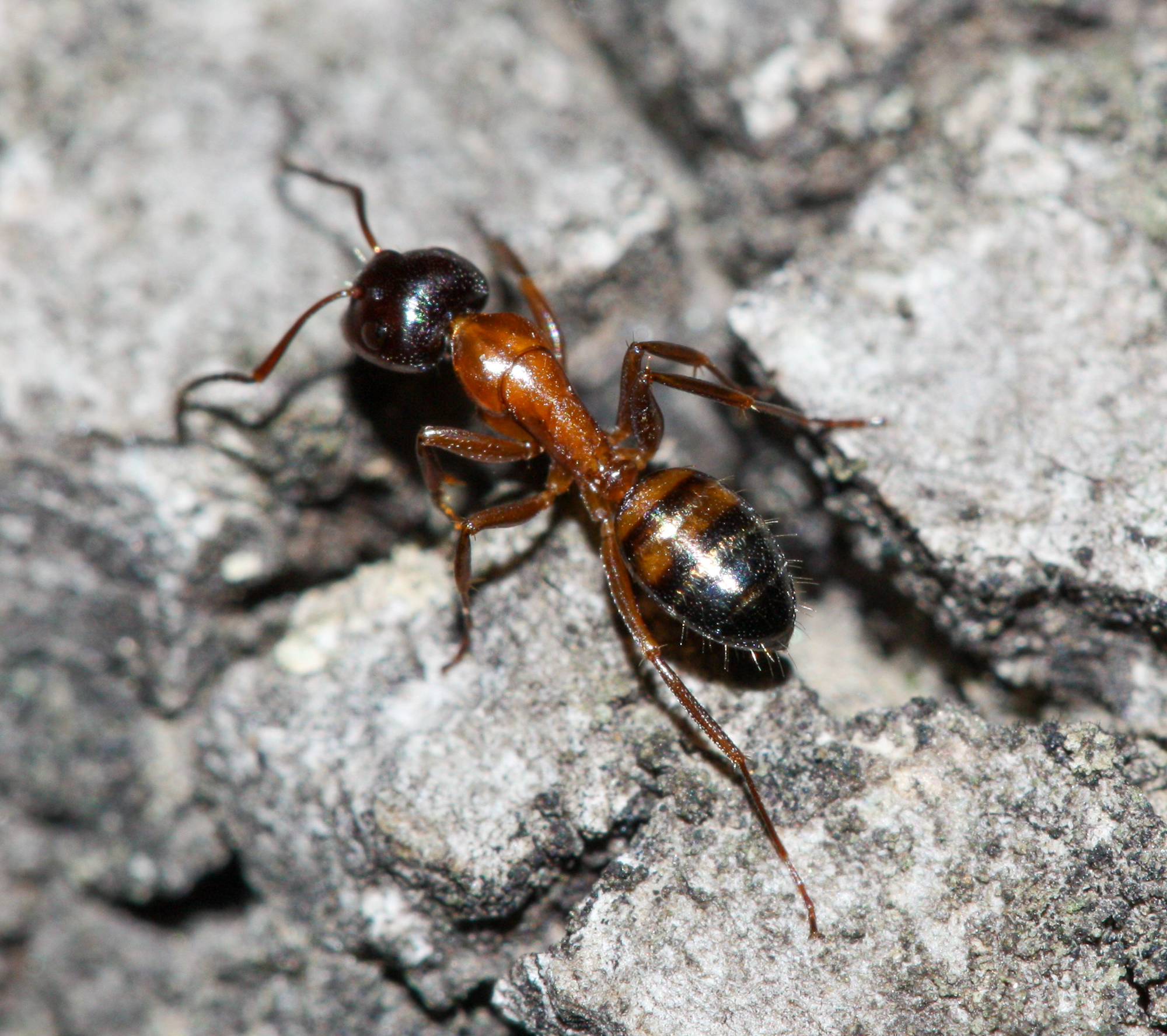
- Camponotus essigi

Scientific classification
- Kingdom: Animalia
- Phylum: Arthropoda
- Class: Insecta
- Order: Hymenoptera
- Family: Formicidae
- Subfamily: Formicinae
- Genus: Camponotus
- Subgenus: Myrmentoma; Forel, 1912

Species
- See text

= Myrmentoma =

Subgenus of insects

Myrmentoma, the cleft-lip carpenter ants, is a subgenus of Camponotus, the carpenter ants. Its Nearctic species nest in galls, branches and stems of plants, under tree bark, in wood and buildings, or soil. Colonies are generally small with a few dozen or a few hundred workers.

== Species ==
As of 2025, Myrmentoma contains over 54 recognized species.

- Camponotus abrahami
- Camponotus aegaeus
- Camponotus aktaci
- Camponotus anatolicus
- Camponotus anthrax
- Camponotus atricolor
- Camponotus bakeri
- Camponotus boghossiani
- Camponotus candiotes
- Camponotus caryae
- Camponotus confucii
- Camponotus cornis
- Camponotus cuauhtemoc
- Camponotus dalmaticus
- Camponotus decipiens
- Camponotus discolor
- Camponotus essigi
- Camponotus fallax
- Camponotus gestroi
- Camponotus heidrunvogtae
- Camponotus himalayanus
- Camponotus honaziensis
- Camponotus hyatti
- Camponotus interjectus
- Camponotus jejuensis
- Camponotus kiesenwetteri
- Camponotus kolthoffi
- Camponotus kopetdaghensis
- Camponotus kurdistanicus
- Camponotus lameerei
- Camponotus lateralis
- Camponotus libanicus
- Camponotus minus
- Camponotus montivagus
- Camponotus nearcticus
- Camponotus nipponensis
- Camponotus nitidescens
- Camponotus piceus
- Camponotus quadrinotatus
- Camponotus rebeccae
- Camponotus rectithorax
- Camponotus sayi
- Camponotus schulzi
- Camponotus semirufus
- Camponotus sicheli
- Camponotus snellingi
- Camponotus spissinodis
- Camponotus staryi
- Camponotus subbarbatus
- Camponotus tergestinus
- Camponotus truebi
- Camponotus varius
- Camponotus vogti
- Camponotus wroughtonii
