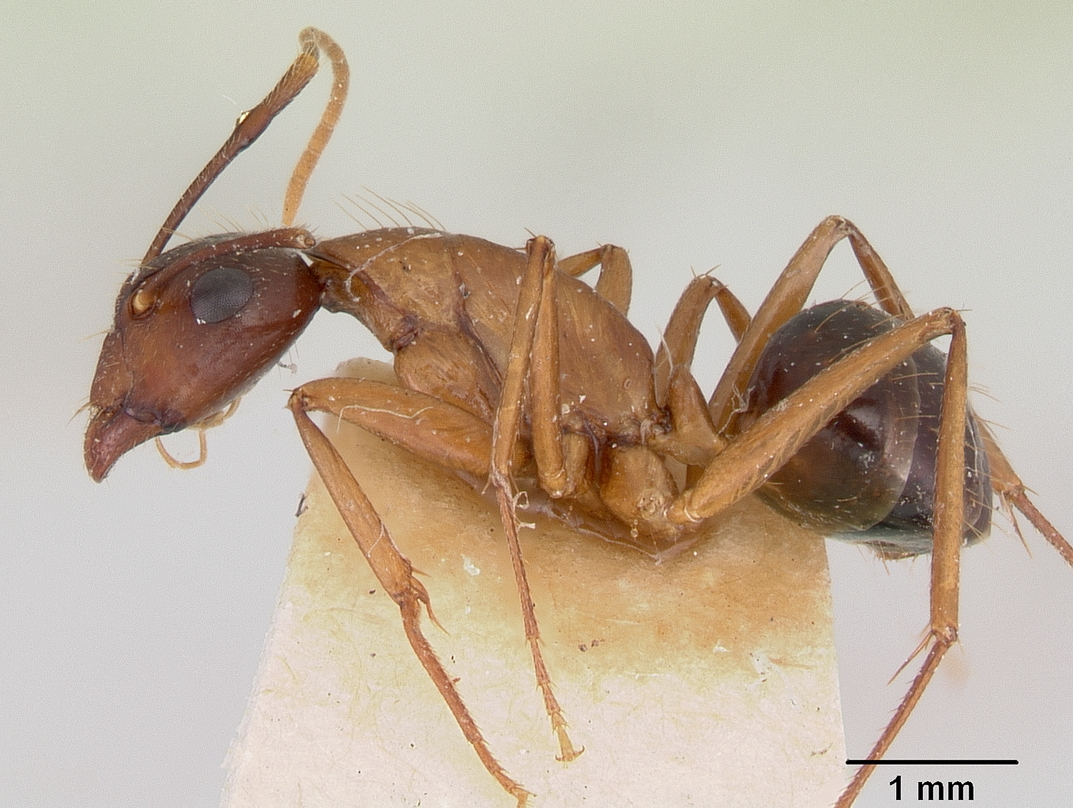

Scientific classification
- Domain: Eukaryota
- Kingdom: Animalia
- Phylum: Arthropoda
- Class: Insecta
- Order: Hymenoptera
- Family: Formicidae
- Subfamily: Formicinae
- Genus: Camponotus
- Subgenus: Tanaemyrmex
- Species: C. pudorosus

Binomial name
- Camponotus pudorosus Emery, 1925

= Camponotus pudorosus =

Species of ant

Camponotus pudorosus is a species of carpenter ant native to Arizona, New Mexico, Colorado, Mexico, and Guatemala. Originally described in 1925 by Carlo Emery and synonymized by W. W. Kempf in 1972, the species was revived in 2006 from the Camponotus festinatus complex by Roy Snelling.
