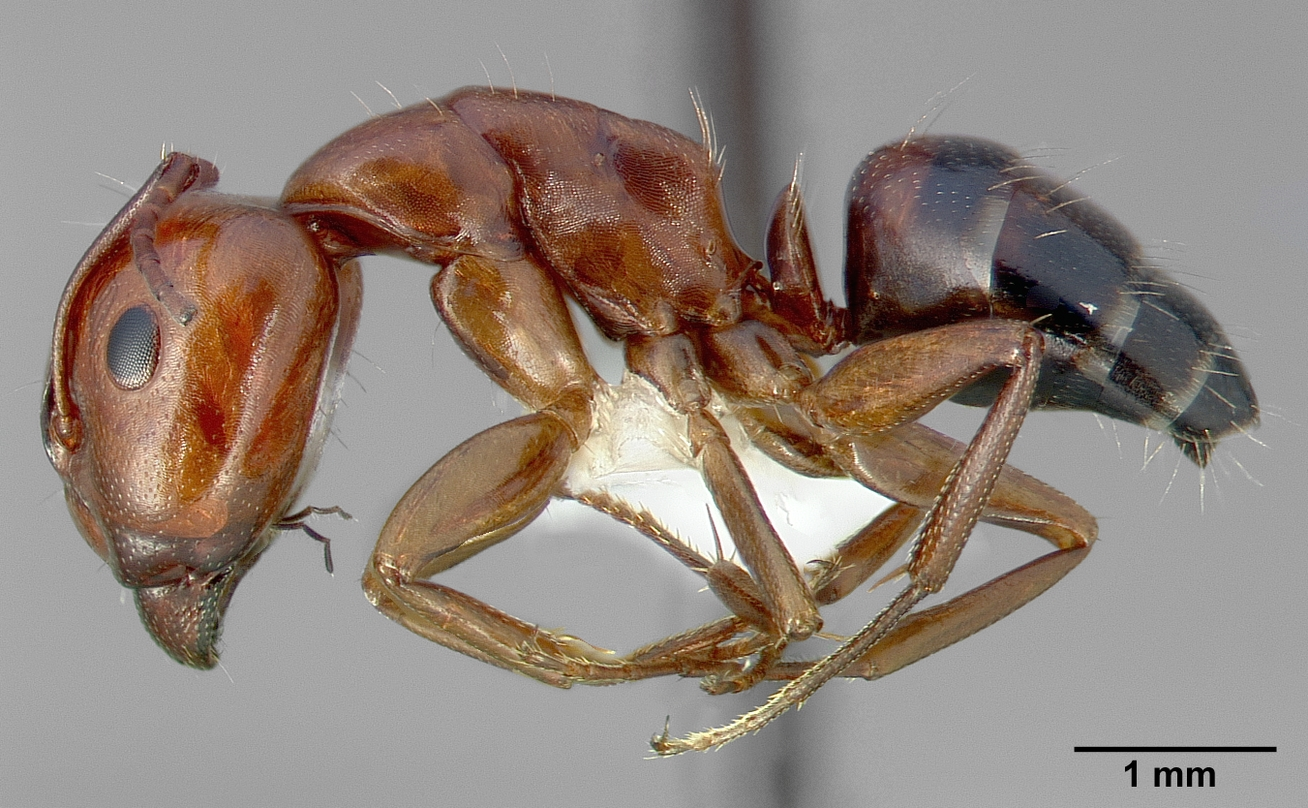
- Camponotus essigi AntWeb specimen

Scientific classification
- Domain: Eukaryota
- Kingdom: Animalia
- Phylum: Arthropoda
- Class: Insecta
- Order: Hymenoptera
- Family: Formicidae
- Subfamily: Formicinae
- Genus: Camponotus
- Subgenus: Myrmentoma
- Species: C. essigi

Binomial name
- Camponotus essigi Smith, 1923

= Camponotus essigi =

Species of ant

Camponotus essigi is a species of carpenter ant native to the western United States and possibly Coahuila. A mislabeled specimen apparently from Trinidad and Tobago, outside of its typical distribution, was determined to be a location error by R. R. Snelling in 2000.
