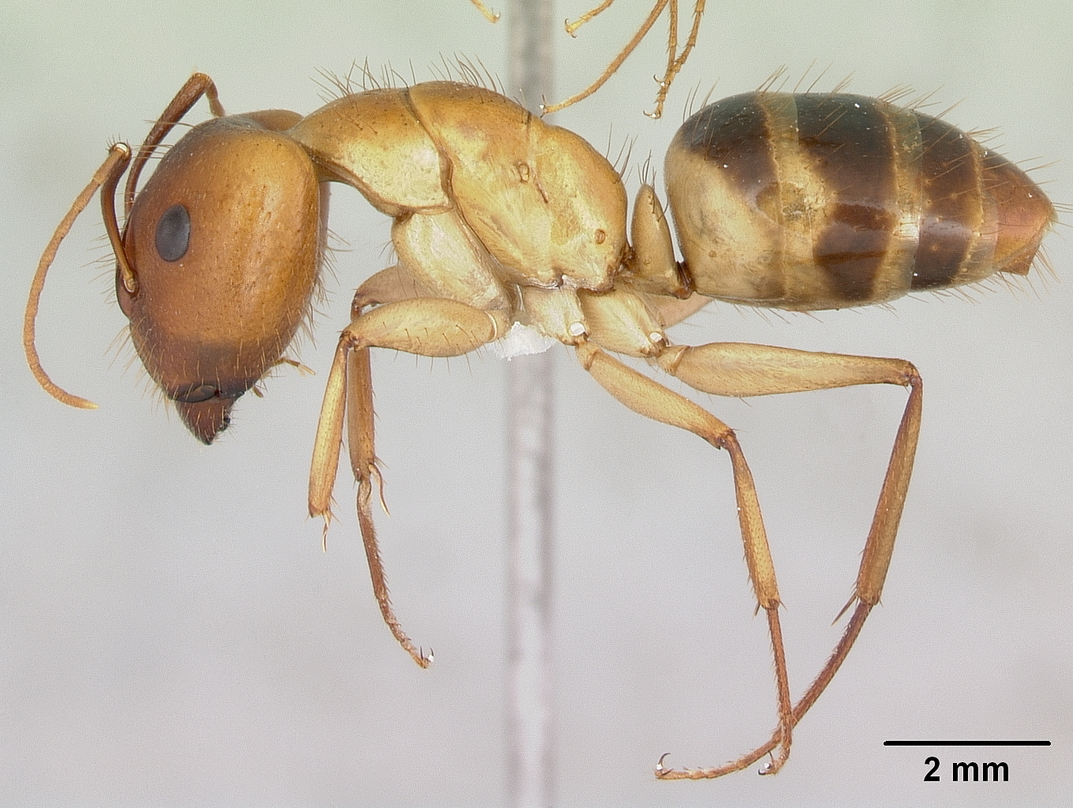

Scientific classification
- Kingdom: Animalia
- Phylum: Arthropoda
- Clade: Pancrustacea
- Class: Insecta
- Order: Hymenoptera
- Family: Formicidae
- Subfamily: Formicinae
- Genus: Camponotus
- Subgenus: Tanaemyrmex
- Species: C. microps

Binomial name
- Camponotus microps Snelling, R.R., 2006

= Camponotus microps =

Species of ant

Camponotus microps is a species of carpenter ant native to Arizona, New Mexico, Sonora, Queretaro, and Guanajuato. This species was separated from the Camponotus festinatus complex in 2006 by Roy Snelling.
