= Cuauhtémoc Municipality =

Cuauhtémoc Municipality may refer to

- Cuauhtémoc Municipality, Chihuahua
- Cuauhtémoc Municipality, Colima
- Cuauhtémoc Municipality, Zacatecas

Compound municipality names with "Cuauhtémoc":

- Ixcateopan de Cuauhtémoc (municipality), Guerrero
- Rojas de Cuauhtémoc (municipality), Oaxaca
- Santa Ana Cuauhtémoc (municipality), Oaxaca
- Tepeyahualco de Cuauhtémoc (municipality), Puebla

See also

- Cuauhtémoc (disambiguation)
