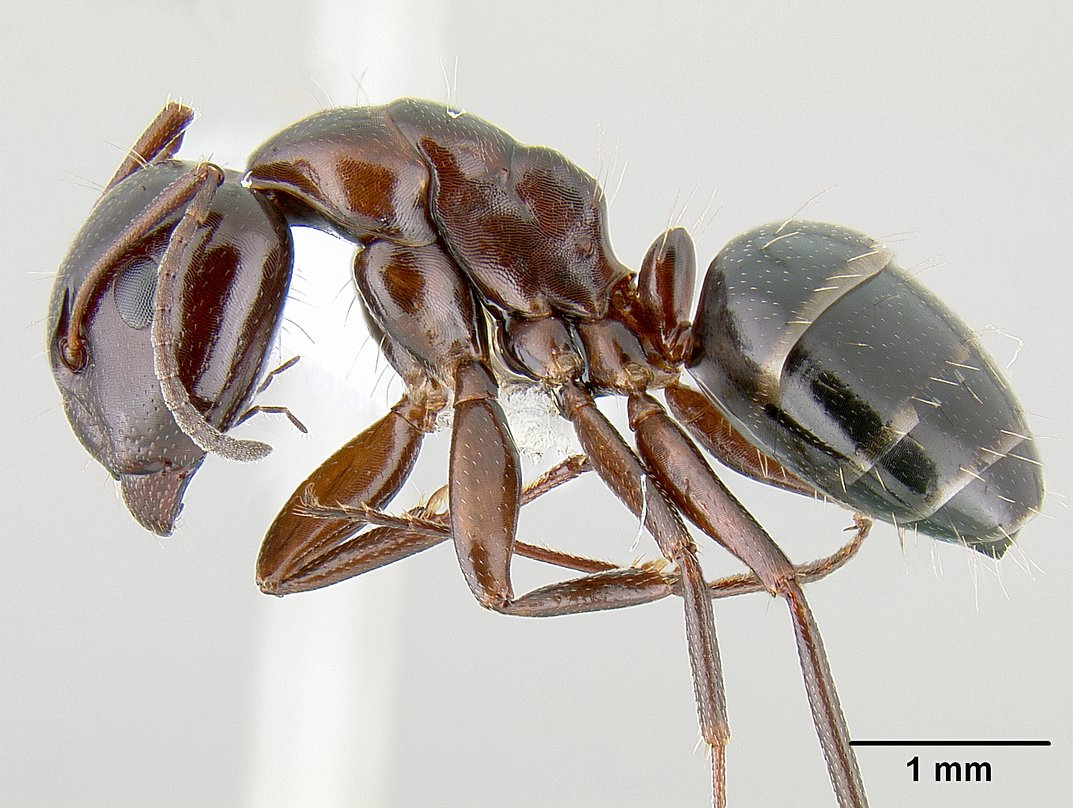

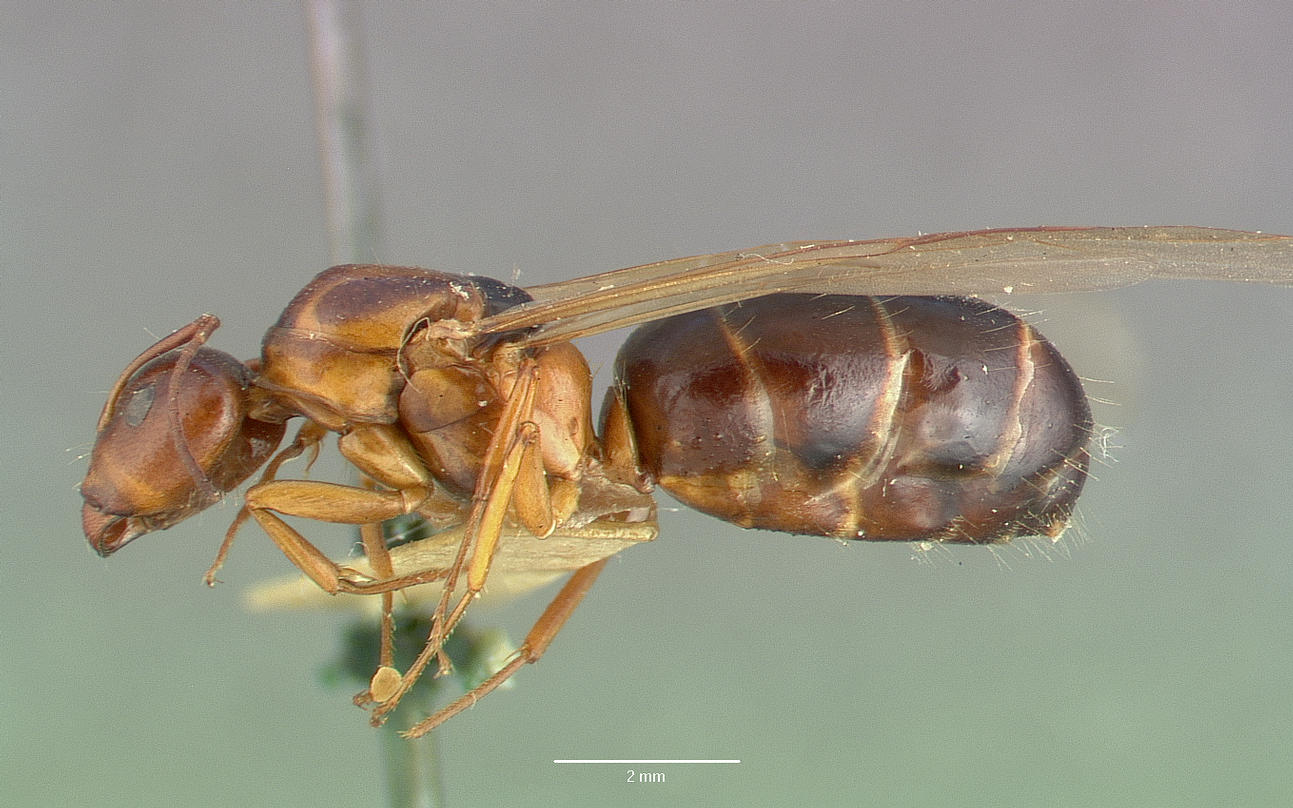
- Camponotus hyatti worker (top) and alate queen (bottom)

Scientific classification
- Domain: Eukaryota
- Kingdom: Animalia
- Phylum: Arthropoda
- Class: Insecta
- Order: Hymenoptera
- Family: Formicidae
- Subfamily: Formicinae
- Genus: Camponotus
- Subgenus: Myrmentoma
- Species: C. hyatti

Binomial name
- Camponotus hyatti Emery, 1893

= Camponotus hyatti =

Species of ant

Camponotus hyatti is a species of carpenter ant. The species is native to the northern Pacific coast, from Oregon to the Baja California Peninsula. The species is characterized by its five-toothed mandibles and the smooth, shiny appearance of its clypeus, as well as a pronounced metanotal groove, lending the basal surface of the propodeum a distinct convex appearance. It commonly nests in sagebrush, Yucca, manzanita, and oak.
