= The Hellstrom Chronicle =

1971 film by Walon Green

- Promotional film poster
- Directed by: Ed Spiegel; Walon Green
- Written by: David Seltzer
- Produced by: Walon Green
- Starring: Lawrence Pressman
- Cinematography: Helmuth Barth; Walon Green; Vilis Lapenieks; Ken Middleham
- Edited by: John Soh
- Music by: Lalo Schifrin
- Production company: Wolper Pictures
- Distributed by: Cinema 5 Distributing
- Release date: June 28, 1971
- Running time: 90 minutes
- Country: United States
- Language: English
- Box office: $1.5 million

The Hellstrom Chronicle is an American film released in 1971, which combines elements of documentary, horror and apocalyptic prophecy to present a satirical depiction of the struggle for survival between humans and insects. It won both the 1972 Academy Award for Best Documentary Feature at the 44th Academy Awards and BAFTA Award for Best Documentary at the 25th British Academy Film Awards. It was conceived and produced by David L. Wolper, directed by Walon Green and written by David Seltzer, who earned a nomination for the Writers Guild of America Award for Best Original Screenplay at the 24th Writers Guild of America Awards. The film won the Technical Grand Prize at the 1971 Cannes Film Festival.

== Plot ==
Fictional scientist Dr. Nils Hellstrom guides viewers throughout the film. He claims, on the basis of scientific-sounding theories, that insects will ultimately win the fight for survival on Earth because of their adaptability and ability to reproduce rapidly and that the human race will lose the fight largely because of excessive individualism. The film combines short clips from horror and science fiction movies with extraordinary camera sequences of butterflies, locusts, wasps, termites, ants, mayflies, other insects rarely seen before on film.

== Cast ==
- Lawrence Pressman as Dr. Nils Hellstrom

== Production ==
Technical advisers Roy Snelling and Charles Hogue were entomologists at the Los Angeles County Museum of Natural History.

== Reception ==
Rotten Tomatoes gave the film a 75% score based on reviews from 8 critics. Walon Green later called it "almost yellow-journally but good. We were giving the audience an elbow to the ribs every third line."

== Awards ==
- 1972 Academy Award for Best Documentary Feature
- 1972 BAFTA Award for Best Documentary

== Home video ==
The film was released on DVD and Blu-ray January 10, 2012 from Olive Films.

== See also ==
- Phase IV
- Hellstrom's Hive
- Watership Down
- The Plague Dogs
- The Adventures of Chatran
