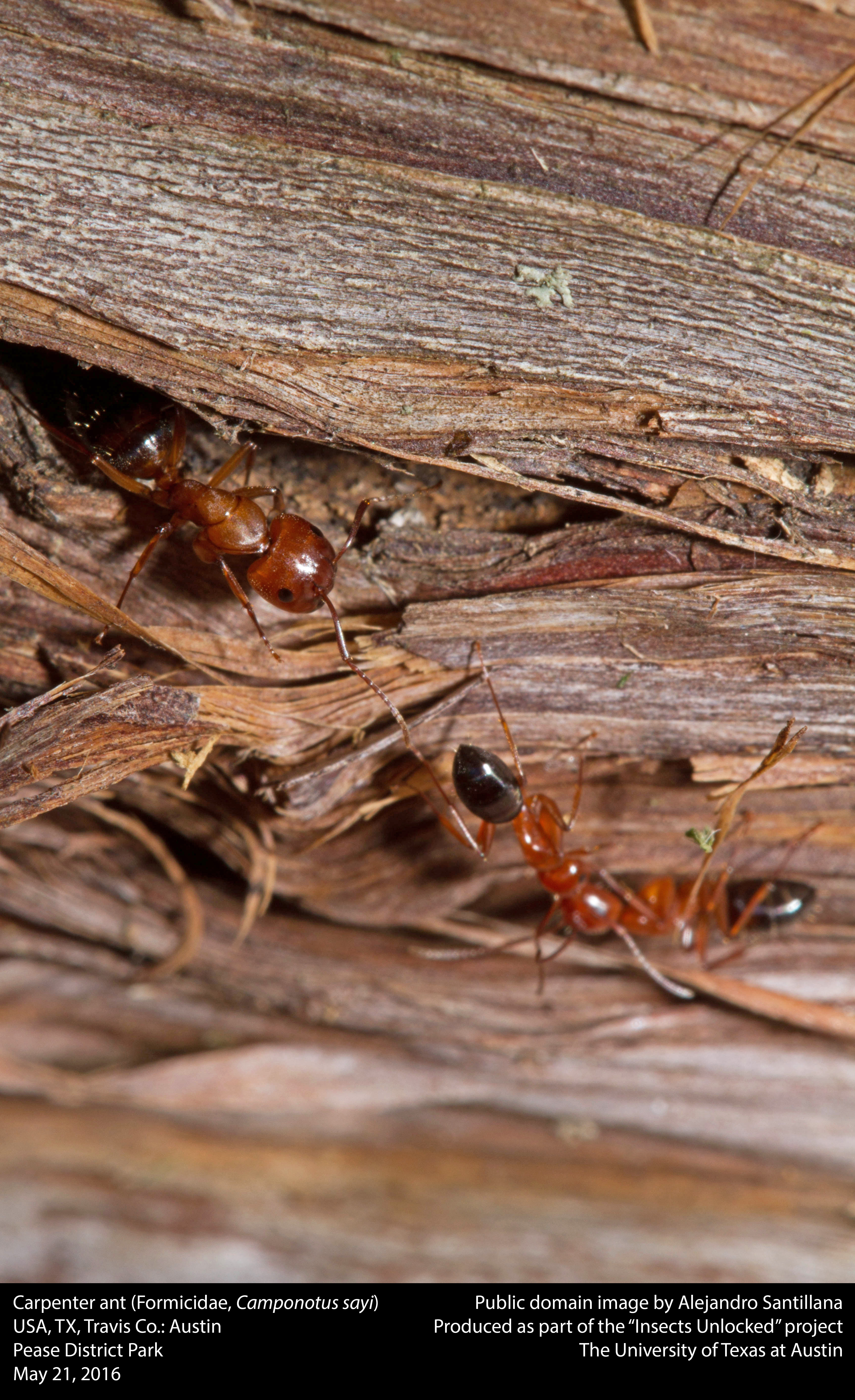

Scientific classification
- Domain: Eukaryota
- Kingdom: Animalia
- Phylum: Arthropoda
- Class: Insecta
- Order: Hymenoptera
- Family: Formicidae
- Subfamily: Formicinae
- Genus: Camponotus
- Subgenus: Myrmentoma
- Species: C. sayi

Binomial name
- Camponotus sayi Emery, 1893

= Camponotus sayi =

Species of ant

Camponotus sayi is a species of carpenter ant native to the southwest United States, northern Mexico, and possibly North Dakota, Ontario, Mississippi, North Carolina, South Carolina, and Florida.

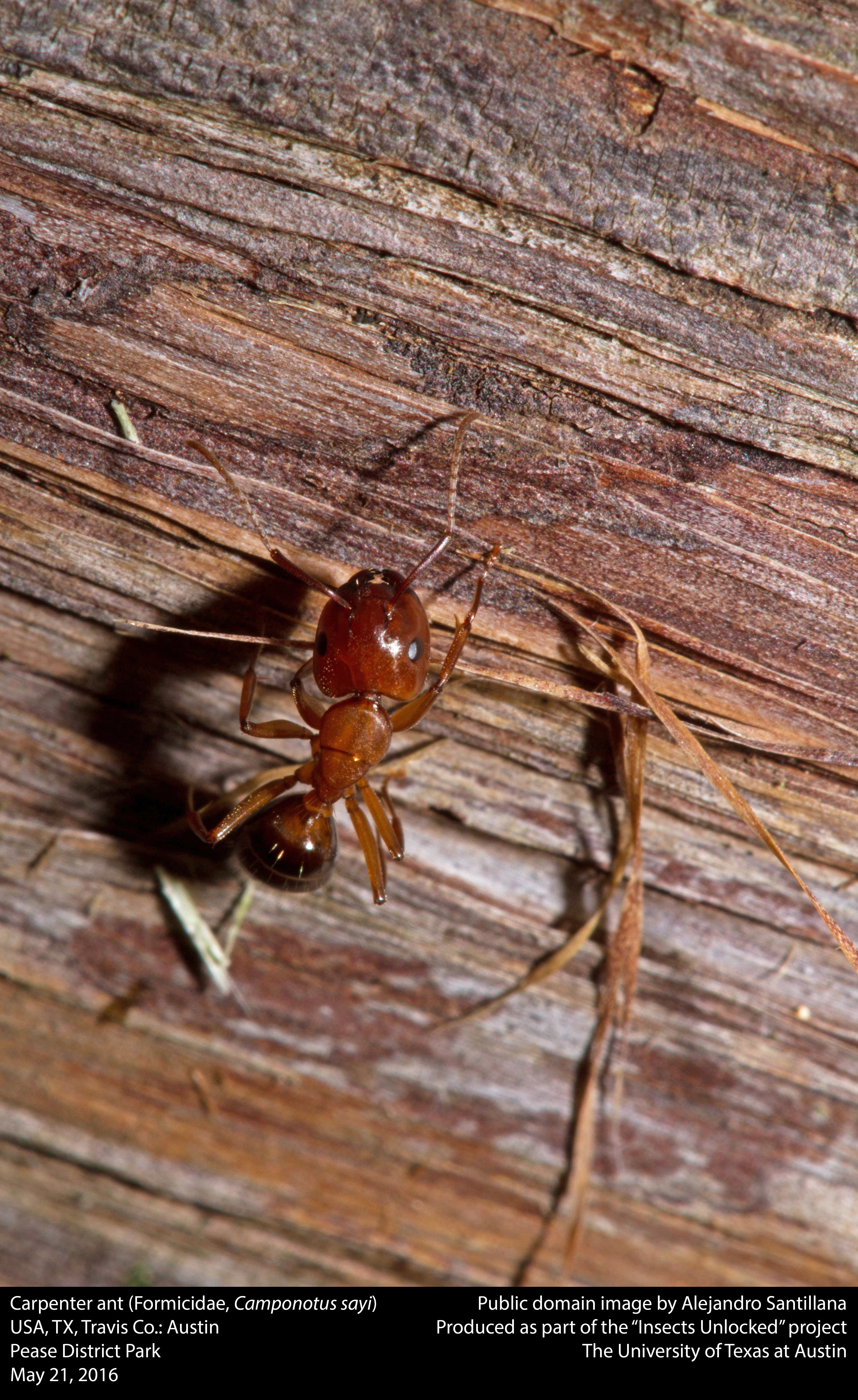

== Subspecies ==
These two subspecies belong to the species Camponotus sayi:

- Camponotus sayi bicolor Pergande
- Camponotus sayi sayi
