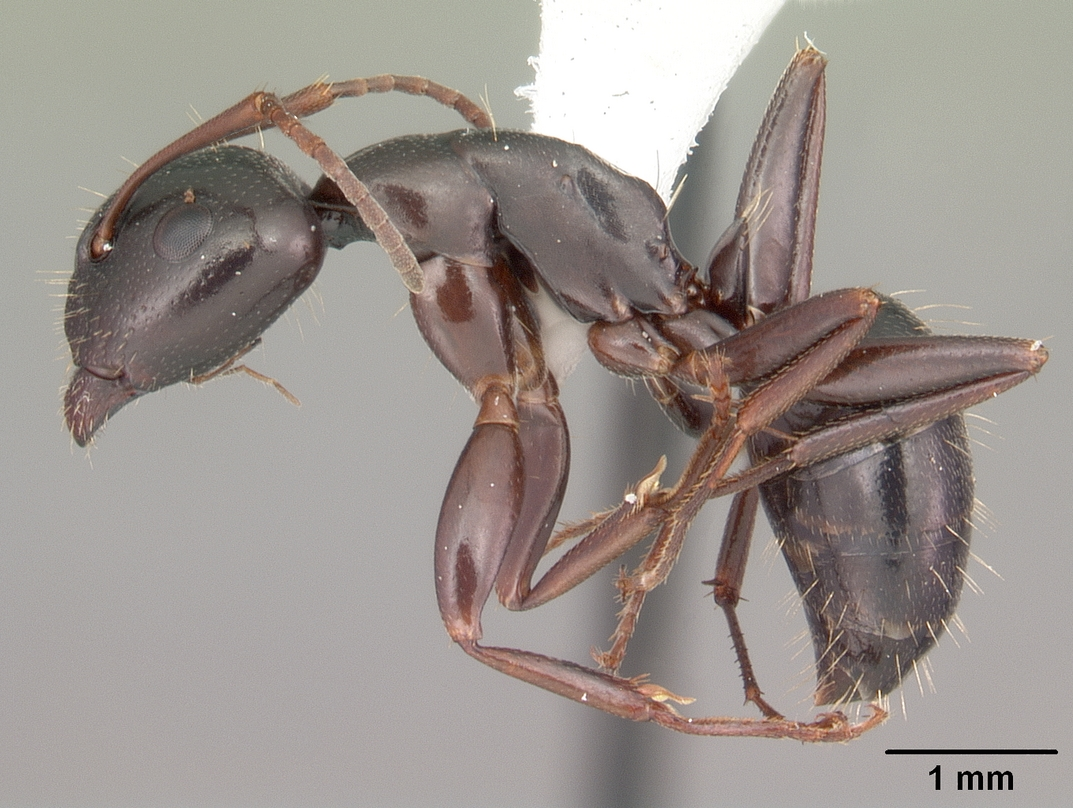

Scientific classification
- Domain: Eukaryota
- Kingdom: Animalia
- Phylum: Arthropoda
- Class: Insecta
- Order: Hymenoptera
- Family: Formicidae
- Subfamily: Formicinae
- Genus: Camponotus
- Subgenus: Myrmentoma
- Species: C. caryae

Binomial name
- Camponotus caryae (Fitch, 1855)

Synonyms
- C. pubsecens Forel, 1874; C. pennsylvanicus Forel, 1879; C. herculeanus caryae Cresson, 1887; C. fallax caryae Teranishi, 1940

= Camponotus caryae =

Species of ant

Camponotus caryae is a species of carpenter ant native to the eastern United States, eastern Canada, Mexico (Nuevo Leon, Chihuahua), and possibly some parts of the western United States, Spain, Italy, and Bulgaria.
