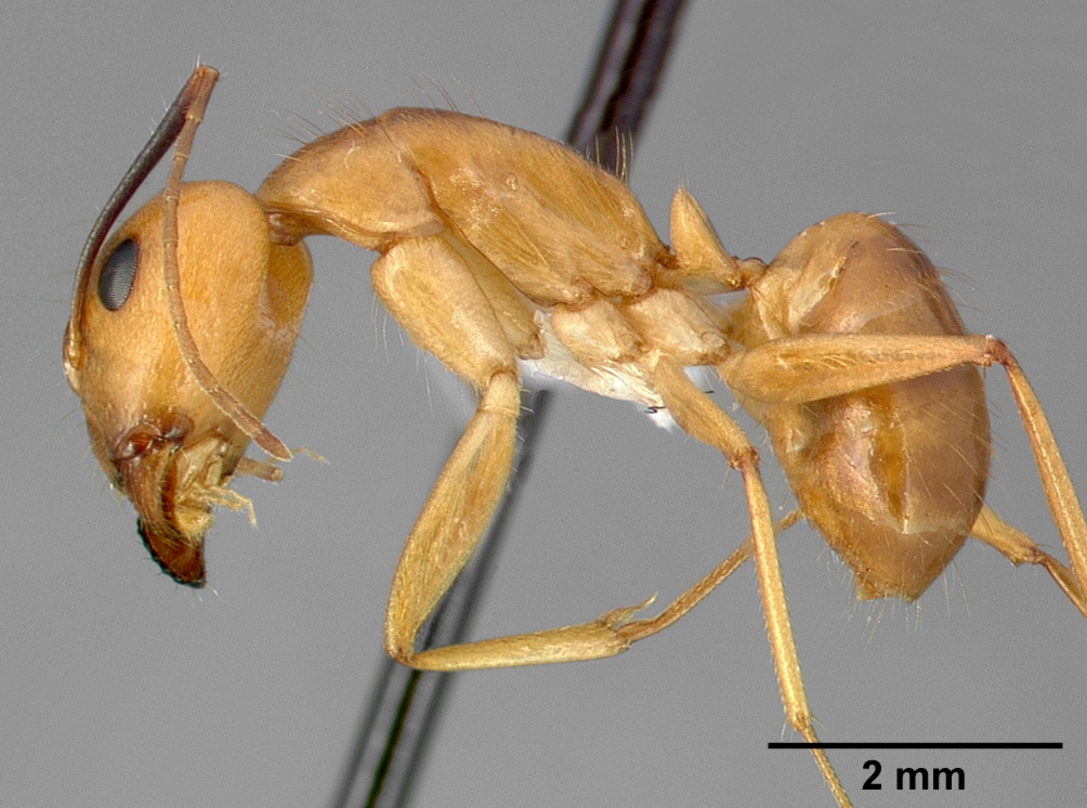

Scientific classification
- Domain: Eukaryota
- Kingdom: Animalia
- Phylum: Arthropoda
- Class: Insecta
- Order: Hymenoptera
- Family: Formicidae
- Subfamily: Formicinae
- Genus: Camponotus
- Subgenus: Tanaemyrmex
- Species: C. fragilis

Binomial name
- Camponotus fragilis Pergande, 1893

= Camponotus fragilis =

Species of carpenter ant from western North America

Camponotus fragilis is a species of carpenter ant endemic to California, Texas, Arizona, New Mexico, and western Mexico. It was first described by Theodore Pergande in 1893, subsequently synonymized, then finally revived by Roy Snelling in 2006.

== Appearance ==
Camponotus fragilis have a yellow complexion with a slightly darker gaster and head.
