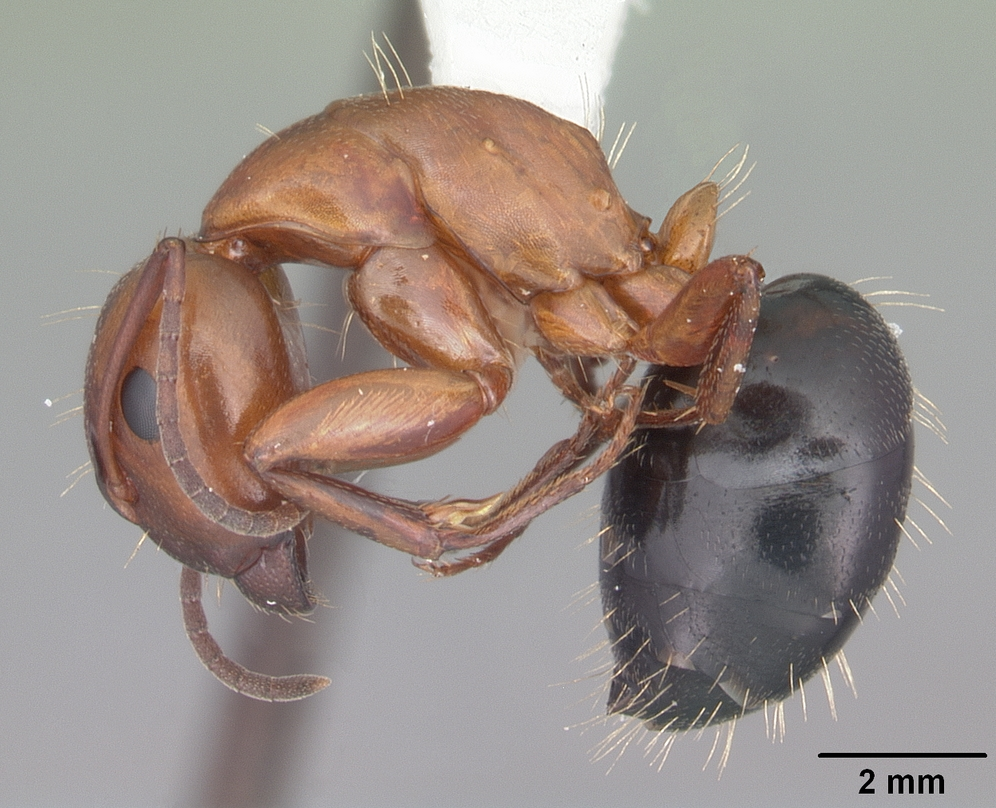

Scientific classification
- Kingdom: Animalia
- Phylum: Arthropoda
- Clade: Pancrustacea
- Class: Insecta
- Order: Hymenoptera
- Family: Formicidae
- Subfamily: Formicinae
- Genus: Camponotus
- Subgenus: Myrmentoma
- Species: C. decipiens

Binomial name
- Camponotus decipiens (Emery, 1893)

Synonyms
- C. marginatus decipiens Emery, 1893; C. fallax decipiens Wheeler, 1910; C. fallax rasilis Wheeler, 1910; C. caryae decipiens Wheeler, 1917; C. caryae rasilis Wheeler, 1917; C. nearcticus decipiens Cole, 1942; Camponotus rasilis Creighton, 1950

= Camponotus decipiens =

Species of ant

Camponotus decipiens is a species of carpenter ant native to the eastern United States, North Dakota, Nebraska, Kansas, Colorado, Texas, Tamaulipas, Nuevo Leon, San Luis Potosi, and possibly Utah, Arizona, Sonora, and California. The specific epithet of the scientific name, decipiens, comes from Latin "dēcipiens", meaning "deceiving, cheating, or trapping".

== Description ==
Workers of this black-gastered species of ant can range from 3 to 7.5 millimeters, compared to the length limit of the genus, 15 millimeters.

== Biology ==
C. decipiens colonies often consist of under 100 worker ants, but some colonies can grow to several hundred workers. Commonly, they nest in areas such as tree branches, logs, stumps and bark, twigs, plank stalk apertures, wooden structures such as posts, and houses; they can mostly be found in the spring and fall.
