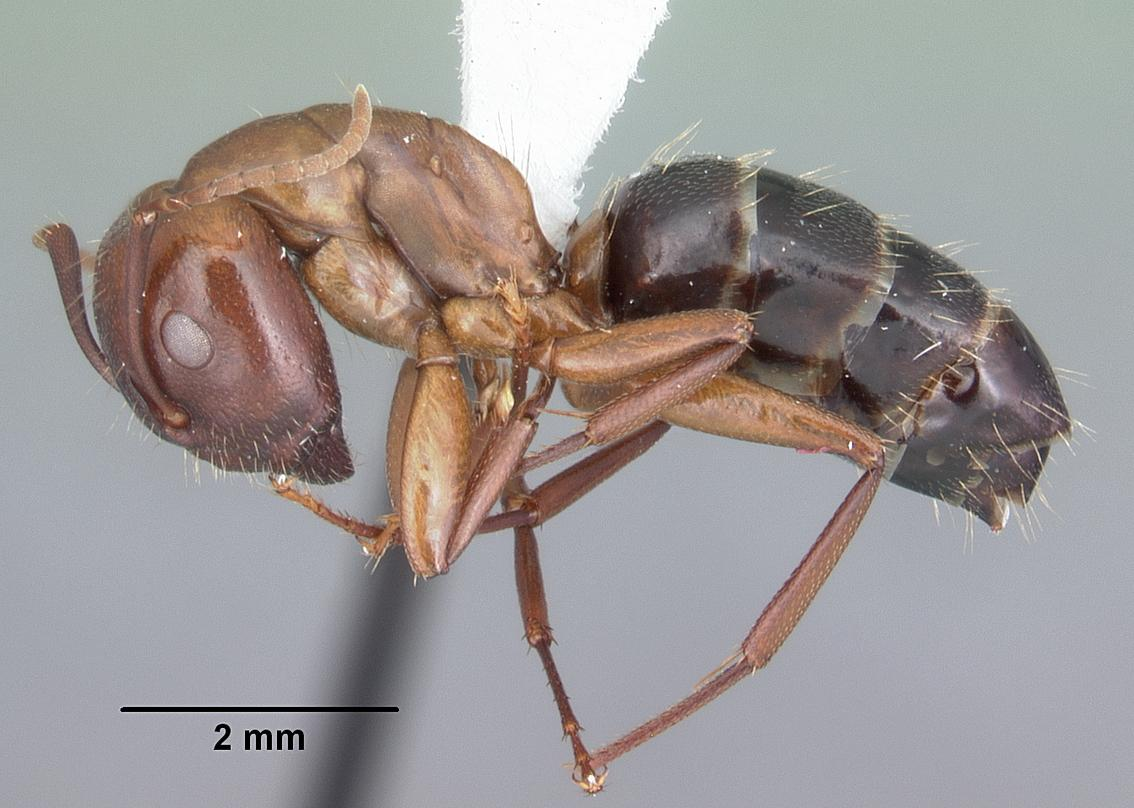

Scientific classification
- Domain: Eukaryota
- Kingdom: Animalia
- Phylum: Arthropoda
- Class: Insecta
- Order: Hymenoptera
- Family: Formicidae
- Subfamily: Formicinae
- Genus: Camponotus
- Subgenus: Myrmentoma
- Species: C. discolor

Binomial name
- Camponotus discolor (Buckley, 1866)

Synonyms
- Formica discolor Buckley, 1866; C. marginatus discolor Mayr, 1886; C. fallax discolor Wheeler, 1910; C. caryae discolor Wheeler, 1917

= Camponotus discolor =

Species of ant

Camponotus discolor is a species of carpenter ant native to the eastern United States, North Dakota, Nebraska, Texas, Kansas, Oklahoma, Nuevo Leon, Tamaulipas, and possibly California, Montana, Utah, and Colorado.
