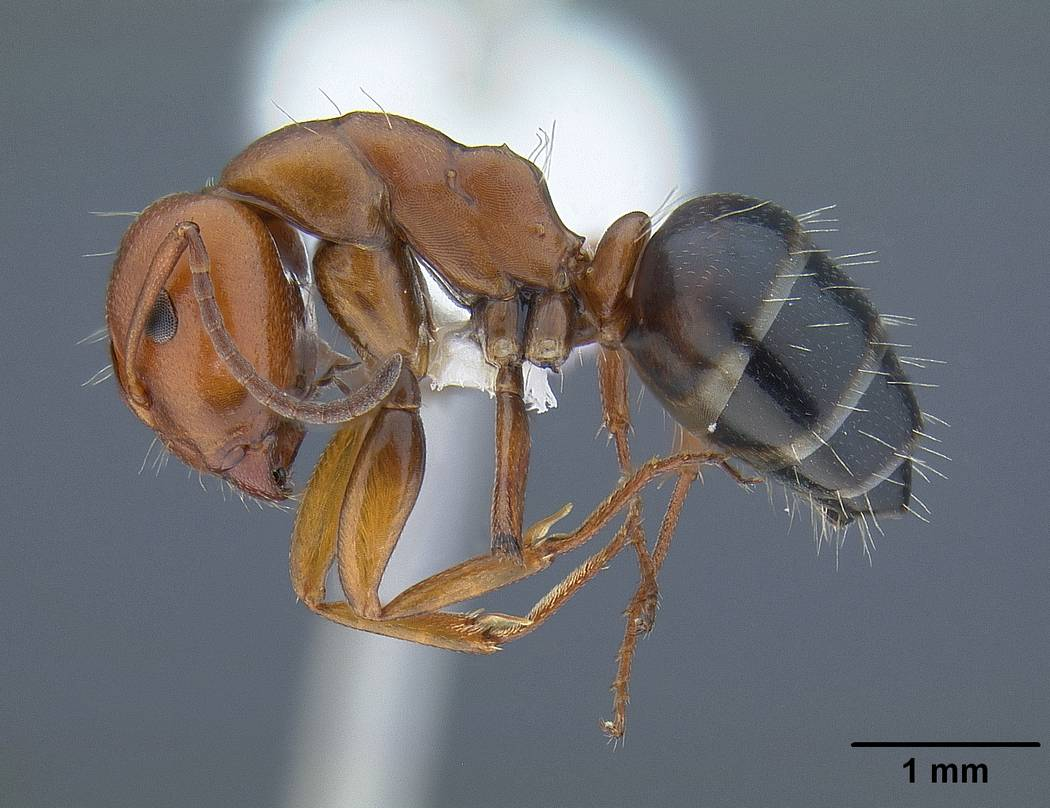

Scientific classification
- Kingdom: Animalia
- Phylum: Arthropoda
- Clade: Pancrustacea
- Class: Insecta
- Order: Hymenoptera
- Family: Formicidae
- Subfamily: Formicinae
- Genus: Camponotus
- Subgenus: Myrmentoma
- Species: C. bakeri

Binomial name
- Camponotus bakeri Wheeler, W.M., 1904

= Camponotus bakeri =

Species of ant

Camponotus bakeri is a species of carpenter ant endemic to the Channel Islands of California, in the western United States.
