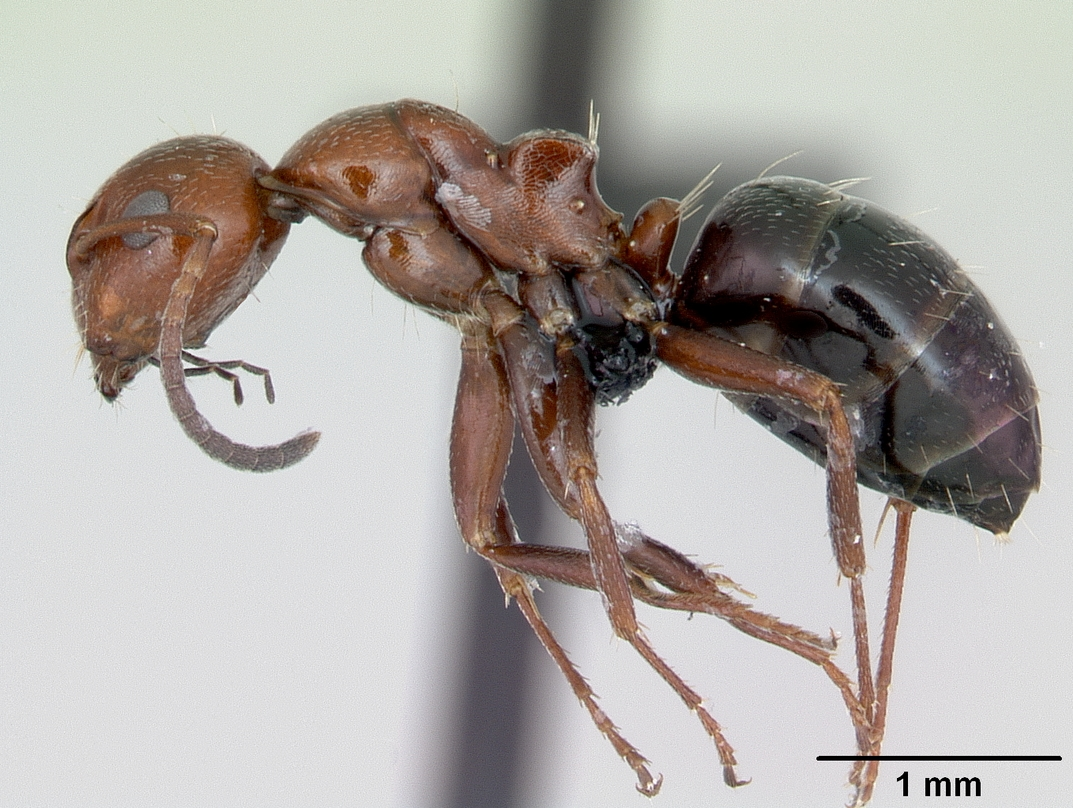
- Camponotus lateralis worker

Scientific classification
- Domain: Eukaryota
- Kingdom: Animalia
- Phylum: Arthropoda
- Class: Insecta
- Order: Hymenoptera
- Family: Formicidae
- Subfamily: Formicinae
- Genus: Camponotus
- Subgenus: Myrmentoma
- Species: C. lateralis

Binomial name
- Camponotus lateralis (Olivier, 1792)

= Camponotus lateralis =

Species of ant

Camponotus lateralis is a species of ant in the genus Camponotus. The species has a wide range and is found in the countries around the Mediterranean, Crimea, Caucasus, northwestern Africa, Asia Minor and Kopet Dag (a mountain range between Turkmenistan and Iran).

== Subspecies ==
- Camponotus lateralis cypridis Santschi, 1939
- Camponotus lateralis purius Santschi, 1929
- Camponotus lateralis rhodius Santschi, 1934
