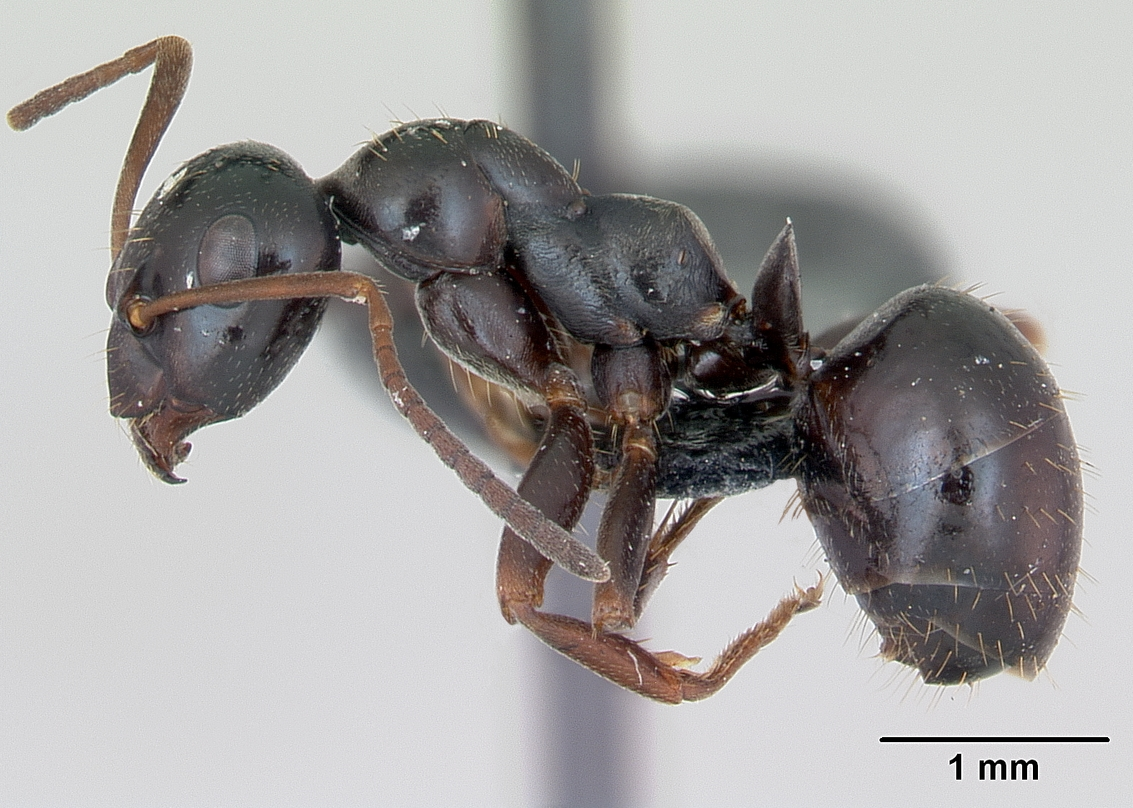

Scientific classification
- Kingdom: Animalia
- Phylum: Arthropoda
- Clade: Pancrustacea
- Class: Insecta
- Order: Hymenoptera
- Family: Formicidae
- Subfamily: Formicinae
- Genus: Formica
- Species: F. candida

Binomial name
- Formica candida Smith, F., 1878

= Formica candida =

Species of insect

Formica candida is a species of ant belonging to the family Formicidae.

It is black and shiny, and very closely resembles the species Formica picea, but among the characters that have been shown to differ on average, noticeable ones are that F. picea has a proportionally longer head and longer antennal scapes than F. candida.

Formica candida have a high resistance to cold winter temperatures.

Recent molecular investigation of specimens collected across northern Eurasia have revaled three different genetic clusters within the populations of Formica picea and Formica candida. A small cluster from Kyrgyzstan correspond to Formica candida, the westernmost cluster, along with one sample from Tibet, correspond to Formica picea and a third eastern cluster could represent a third unnamed taxon. The difference between Formica picea and Formica candida was smaller than between either of them and the third unnamed taxon. While Formica candida formed a clearly separate genetic group, F. picea did not, and it remains uncertain whether F. picea and F. candida are distinct species.
