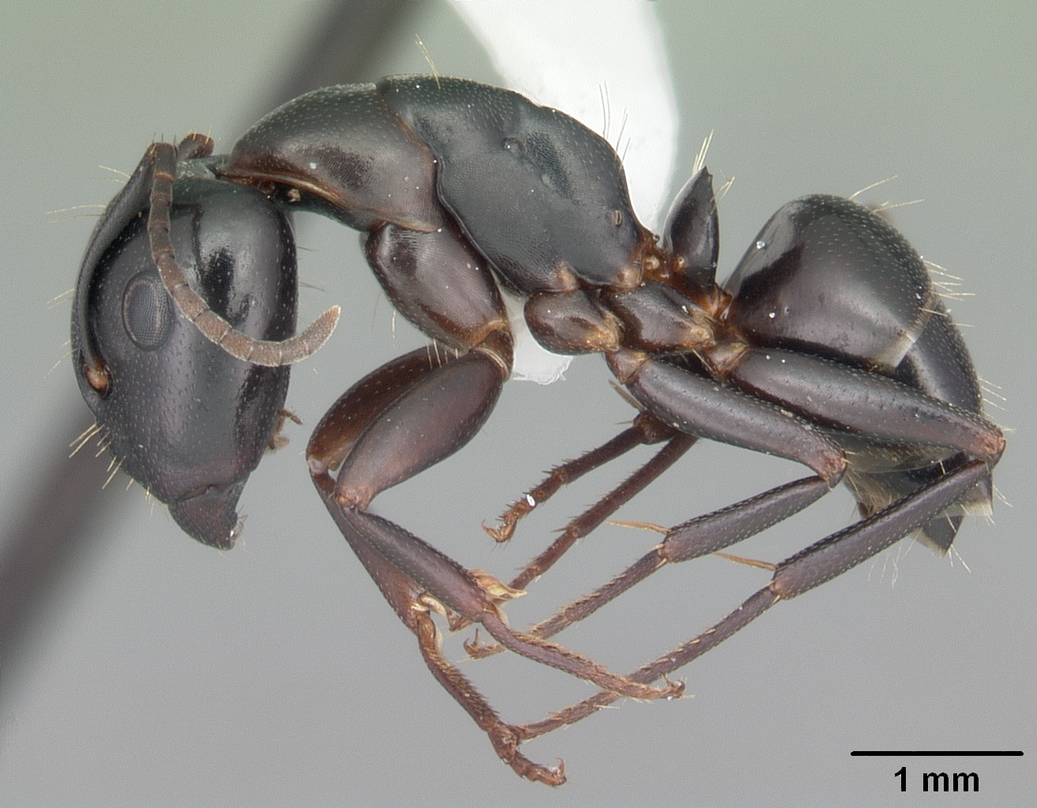

Scientific classification
- Kingdom: Animalia
- Phylum: Arthropoda
- Clade: Pancrustacea
- Class: Insecta
- Order: Hymenoptera
- Family: Formicidae
- Subfamily: Formicinae
- Genus: Camponotus
- Subgenus: Myrmentoma
- Species: C. nearcticus

Binomial name
- Camponotus nearcticus Emery, 1893

Synonyms
- Camponotus fallax pardus (Wheeler, W.M., 1917); Camponotus fallax tanquaryi (Wheeler, W.M., 1917); Camponotus marginatus minutus (Emery, 1893)

= Camponotus nearcticus =

Species of relatively small carpenter ant

Camponotus nearcticus, commonly named smaller carpenter ant, is a relatively small carpenter ant. Its appearance is similar to Formica subsericea, commonly named the black garden ant.

== Identification ==
Workers can range from 3.5 to 7.5 mm (0.14 to 0.30 in) in length. The queen ant's size can range from 4 to 10 millimetres (0.16 to 0.39 in). This species can be distinguished from other subgenus by little amounts of erect hairs on the gena, limited erect hairs on the clypeal disc and finally by the color which is a concolorous dark brown-black.

== Distribution and habitat ==
Camponotus nearcticus colonies can be found in the United States and in Canada. They can be found in Ontario, and extend south from North Dakota to Colorado and Florida.

Prairies and woodlands are preferred habitats for Camponotus nearcticus ants. This ranges from deciduous forests, oaks and other pine forests. Colonies can be found in dead twigs, branches, logs, bark from trees in various conditions, pine cones and in wooden regions in buildings, usually around rooftops. Nests are small, consisting of only a few hundred individuals. However, a large nest which was studied on consisted of 531 individuals, not including the nest's brood, and reproductives were usually seen in nests from March to October. The ant is considered a household pest.
