= Charles L. Hogue =

American entomologist (1935–1992)

Charles Leonard Hogue (1935-1992) was an American entomologist. Hogue was Senior Curator at the Natural History Museum of Los Angeles County and taught at the University of California, Los Angeles. He wrote numerous popular and technical papers, mainly on Diptera, as well as several general books on insects. He died in 1992.

Charles Hogue was the founder of a new discipline he called "Cultural entomology" concerning the influence of insects on human culture in the areas literature, language, music, the arts, interpretive history, religion, and recreation.

Together with Roy Snelling, Hogue was a technical adviser for the Academy Award-winning documentary The Hellstrom Chronicle.

== Works ==
- Insects of the Los Angeles Basin (1974).
- California Insects written with Jerry A. Powell (1981).
- Latin American Insects and Entomology (1993).
- The Armies of the Ant (1972)
