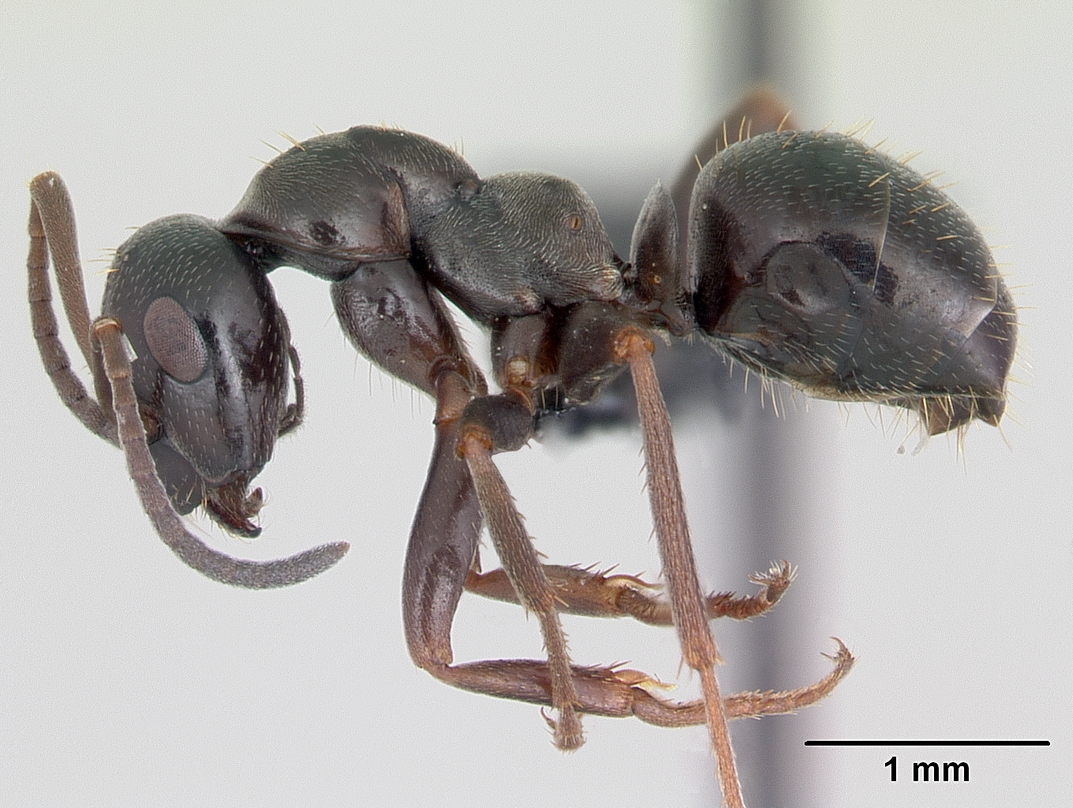

Scientific classification
- Kingdom: Animalia
- Phylum: Arthropoda
- Clade: Pancrustacea
- Class: Insecta
- Order: Hymenoptera
- Family: Formicidae
- Subfamily: Formicinae
- Genus: Formica
- Species: F. picea

Binomial name
- Formica picea Nylander, 1846

Synonyms
- Formica transkaukasica Nasonov, 1889

= Formica picea =

Species of insect

Formica picea, sometimes called Black Bog Ant, is a species of ant belonging to the family Formicidae. It is black and shiny. and have a high resistance to cold winter temperatures and to flooding. It has even been observed to escape below the water surface by climbing down Sphagnum stems. In areas with milder winters, it inhabits bogs, but in colder areas and at higher elevations it can also inhabit grassland on mineral soils.

Formica picea very closely resembles the species Formica candida, but among the characters that have been shown to differ on average, noticeable ones are that F. picea has a proportionally longer head and longer antennal scapes than F. candida. However, recent molecular investigation of specimens collected across northern Eurasia have revealed three different genetic clusters within the populations of Formica picea and Formica candida. The westernmost cluster, along with one sample from Tibet, correspond to Formica picea. A small cluster from Kyrgyzstan correspond to Formica candida, while a third eastern cluster could represent a third unnamed taxon. The difference between Formica picea and Formica candida was smaller than between either of them and the third unnamed taxon. Formica picea did not form a clearly separate genetic group, and it remains uncertain whether F. picea and F. candida are distinct species.

The species was first described as Formica picea by Nylander in 1846, but it was later found out that this name was already used by Leach in 1825, to describe a carpenter ant. However, carpenter ants have been moved to their own genus, Camponotus, and the ant described by Leach now has the name Camponotus piceus. Therefore, the species are not using the same name. However, under normal naming rules by the ICZN the use of Formica picea by Nylander would still be replaced. Some authors tried to comply with this naming rule and used the name Formica transkaucasica given by Nasonov in 1889 for the species known as Formica picea today. However, there is no known type specimen for Formica transkaucasica, and in the area where it was described, several similar species are present that could fit with the original description from Nasonov. A specimen from Nylander's original material is still preserved, and together with Nylander's description allows the species to be identified. At the same time, ICZN have updated with a new rule (Article 23.9.5) which allows an older established name to remain in use in cases like this, where the two species have long been placed in different genera. Therefore, the species is called Formica picea Nylander 1846 in the latest revision, with a specimen collected in Helsinki designated as the lectotype.
