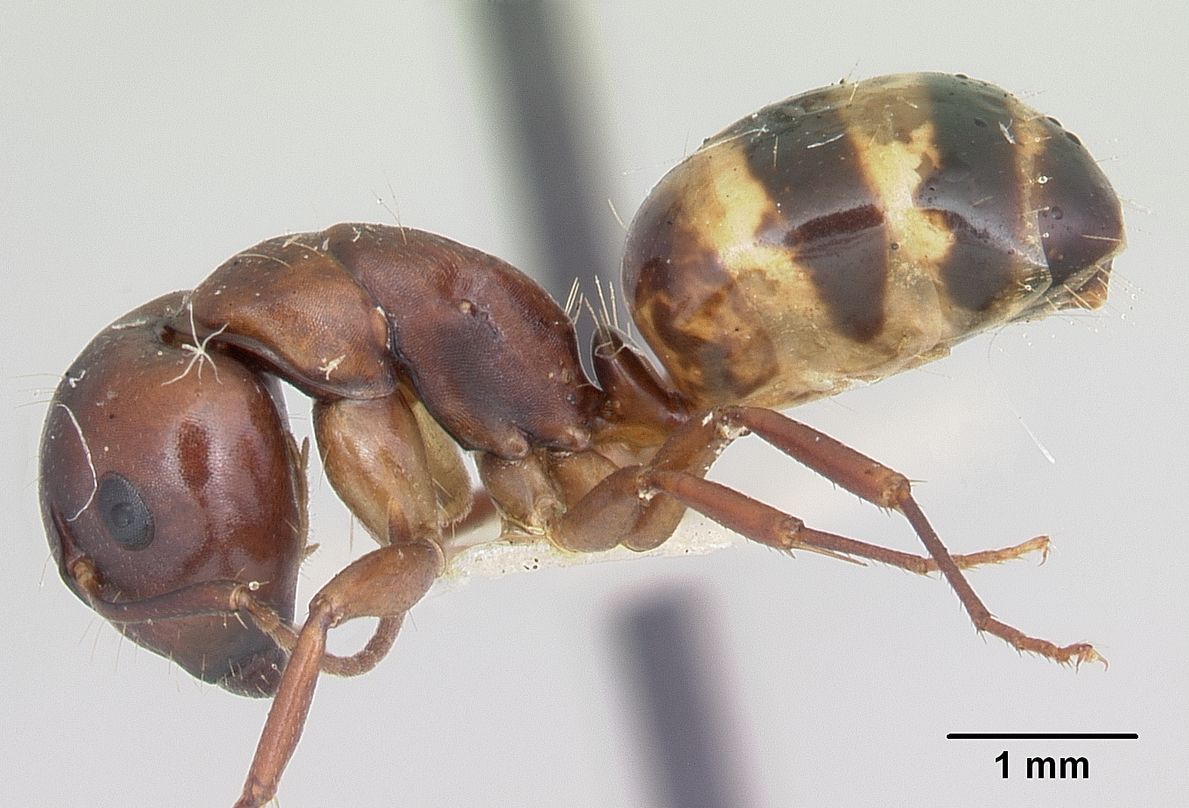

Scientific classification
- Domain: Eukaryota
- Kingdom: Animalia
- Phylum: Arthropoda
- Class: Insecta
- Order: Hymenoptera
- Family: Formicidae
- Subfamily: Formicinae
- Genus: Camponotus
- Subgenus: Myrmentoma
- Species: C. subbarbatus

Binomial name
- Camponotus subbarbatus Emery, 1893

= Camponotus subbarbatus =

Species of ant

Camponotus subbarbatus. also known as the bearded carpenter ant, is a species of carpenter ant native to eastern North America.

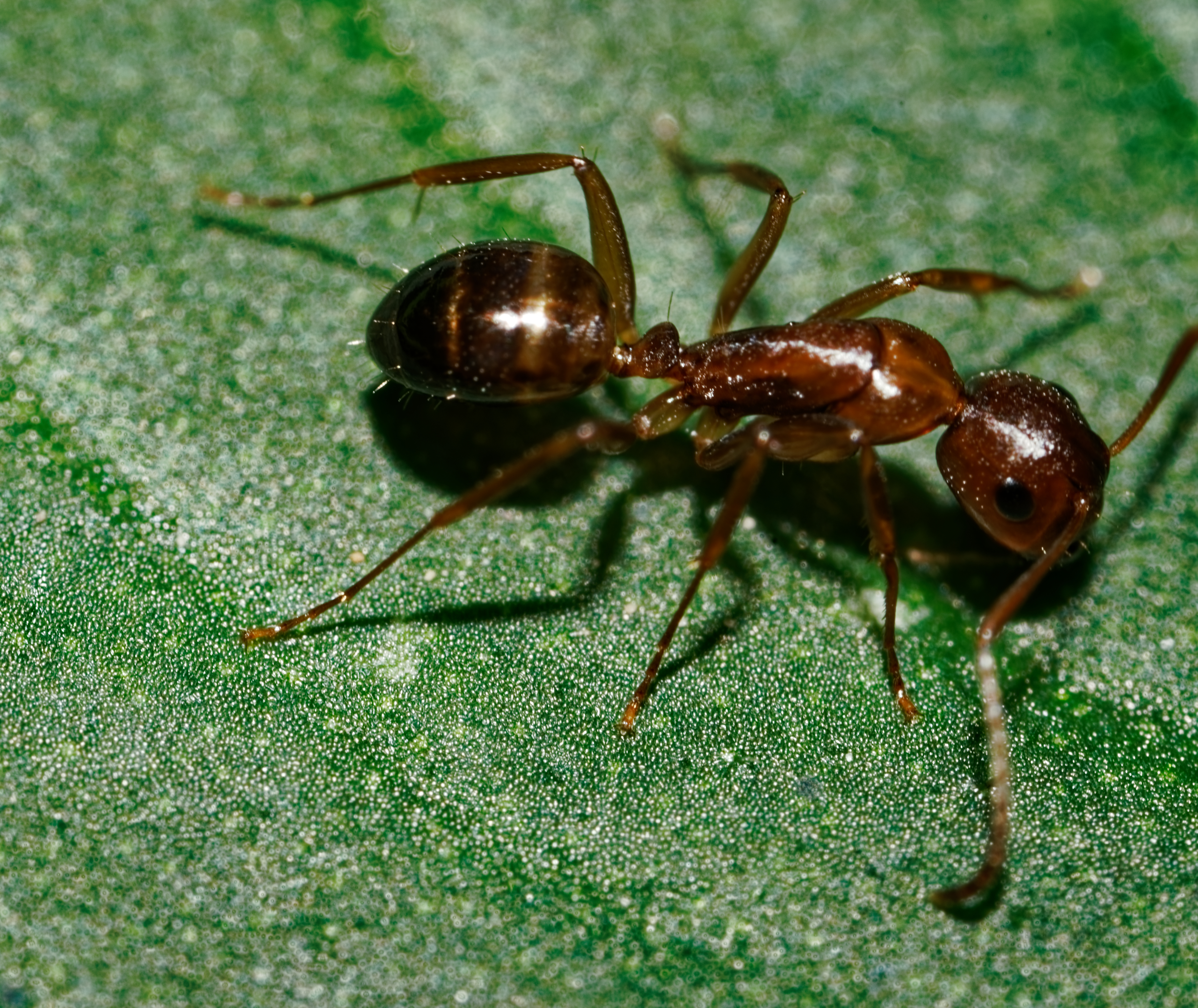
C. subbarbatus minor worker

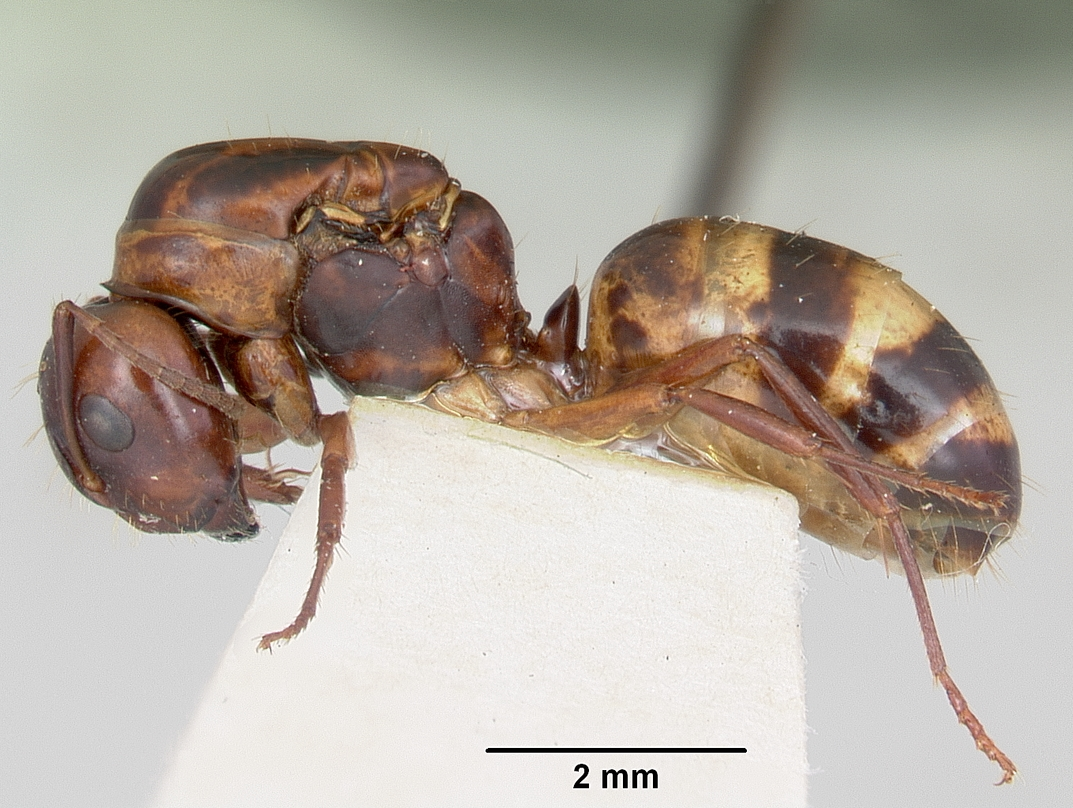
C. subbarbatus queen antweb.org specimen
