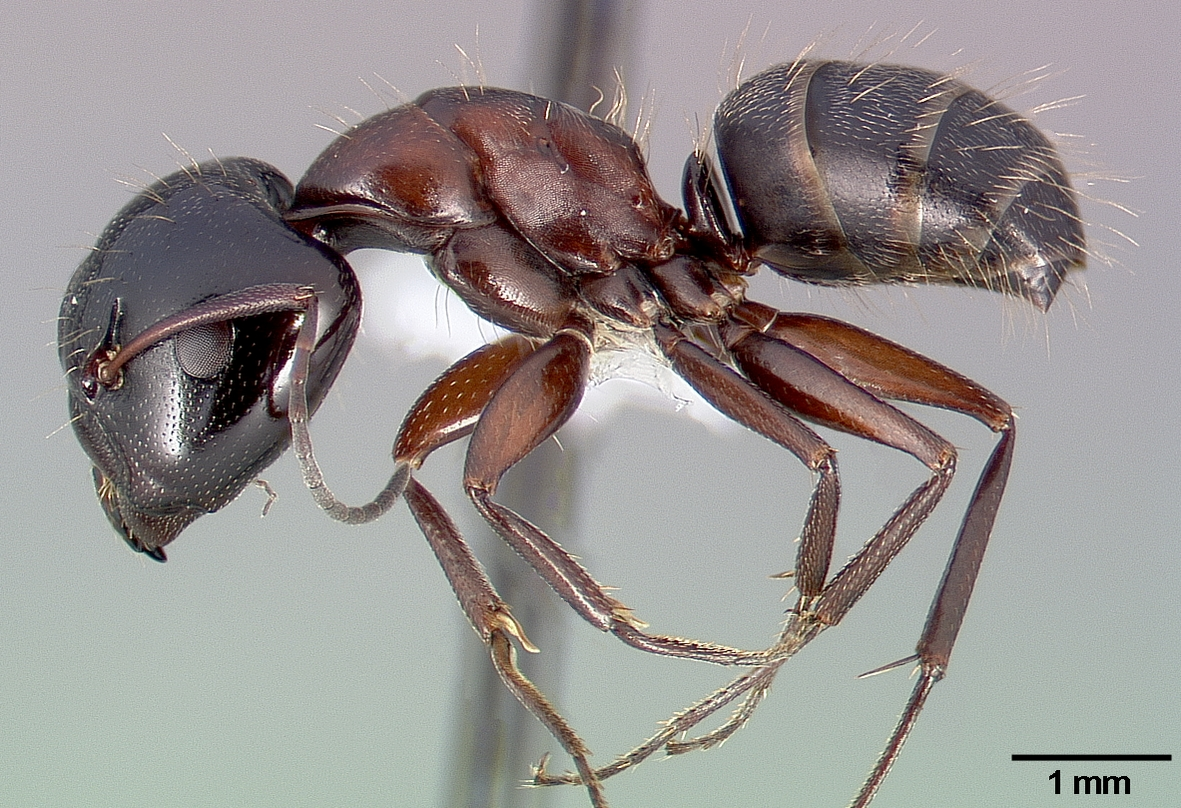

Scientific classification
- Kingdom: Animalia
- Phylum: Arthropoda
- Clade: Pancrustacea
- Class: Insecta
- Order: Hymenoptera
- Family: Formicidae
- Subfamily: Formicinae
- Genus: Camponotus
- Subgenus: Myrmentoma
- Species: C. anthrax

Binomial name
- Camponotus anthrax Wheeler, 1911

= Camponotus anthrax =

Species of ant

Camponotus anthrax is a species of carpenter ant in the subgenus Myrmentoma. It is endemic to western North America.
