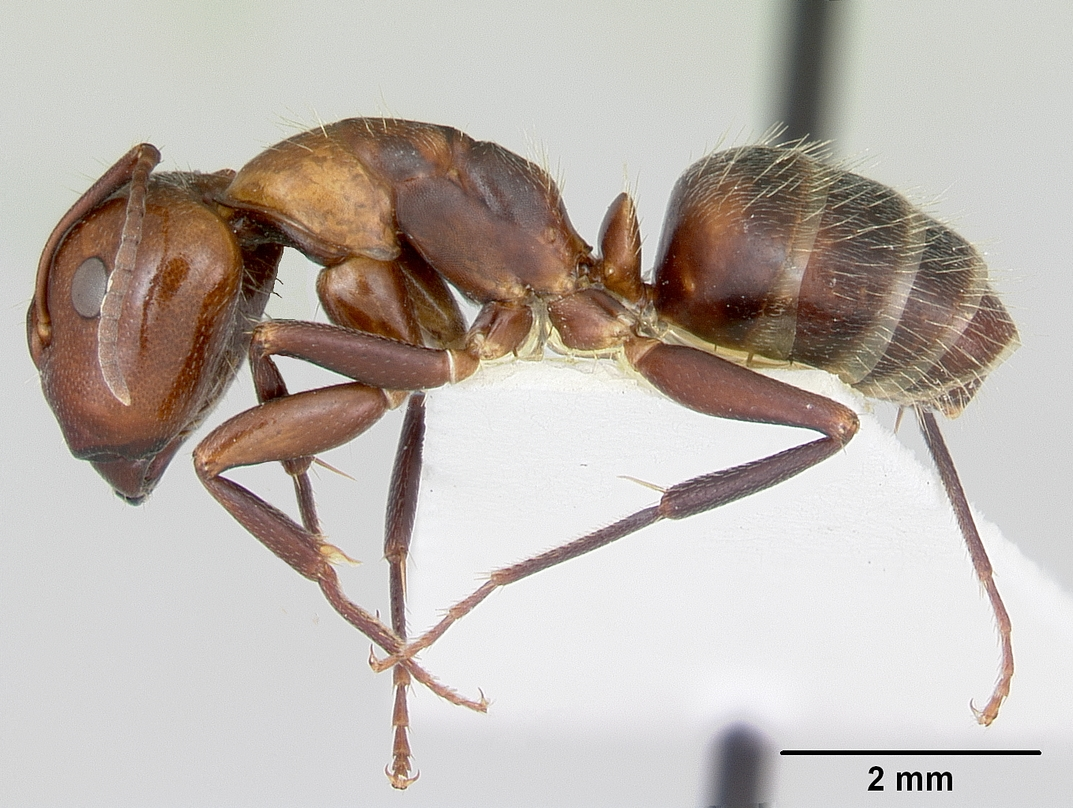

Scientific classification
- Kingdom: Animalia
- Phylum: Arthropoda
- Clade: Pancrustacea
- Class: Insecta
- Order: Hymenoptera
- Family: Formicidae
- Subfamily: Formicinae
- Genus: Camponotus
- Subgenus: Myrmentoma
- Species: C. cuauhtemoc

Binomial name
- Camponotus cuauhtemoc Snelling, 1988

= Camponotus cuauhtemoc =

Species of ant

Camponotus cuauhtemoc is a species of carpenter ant native to Texas and Chihuahua.
