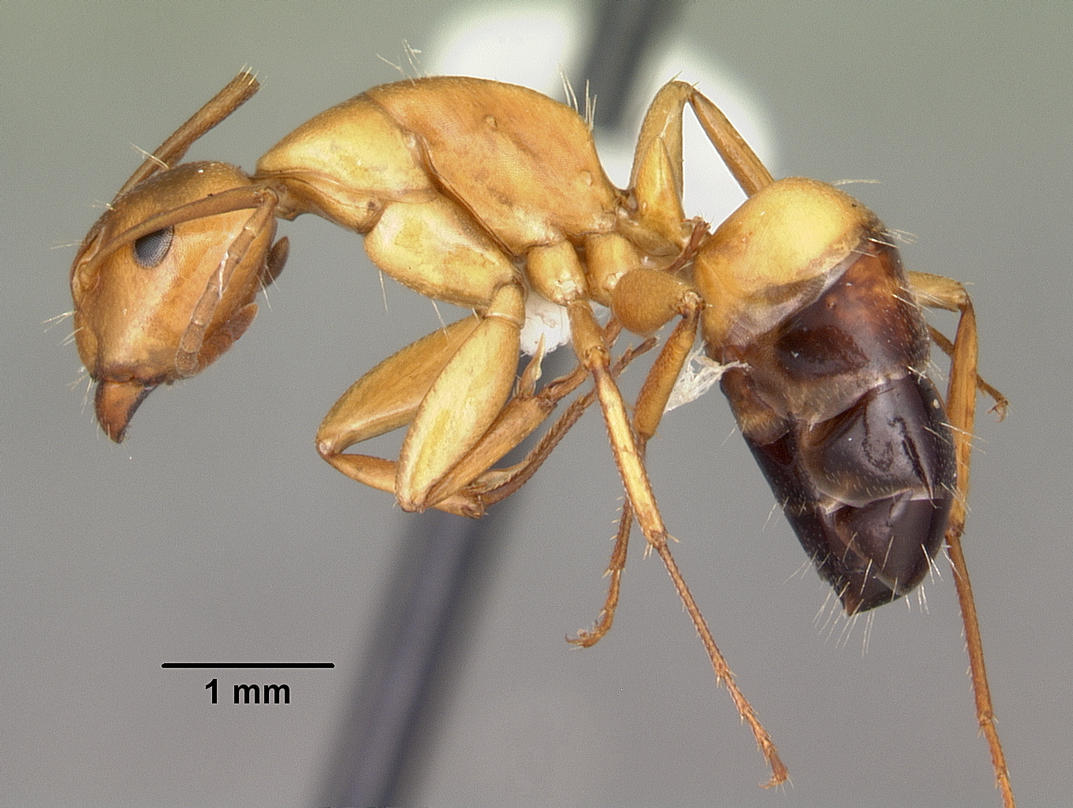

Scientific classification
- Kingdom: Animalia
- Phylum: Arthropoda
- Clade: Pancrustacea
- Class: Insecta
- Order: Hymenoptera
- Family: Formicidae
- Subfamily: Formicinae
- Genus: Camponotus
- Subgenus: Myrmentoma
- Species: C. snellingi

Binomial name
- Camponotus snellingi Bolton, 1995

= Camponotus snellingi =

Species of ant

Camponotus snellingi is a species of carpenter ant native to the southeastern United States and possibly Arizona.
