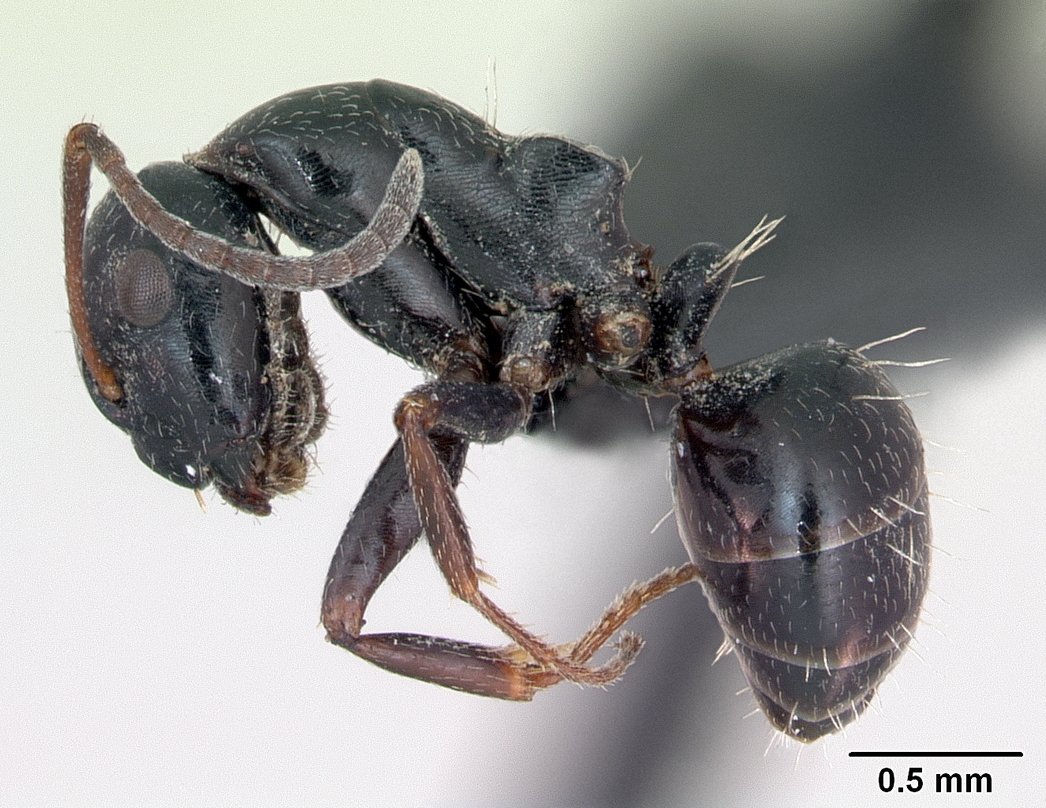
- Camponotus piceus worker

Scientific classification
- Kingdom: Animalia
- Phylum: Arthropoda
- Clade: Pancrustacea
- Class: Insecta
- Order: Hymenoptera
- Family: Formicidae
- Subfamily: Formicinae
- Genus: Camponotus
- Species: C. piceus

Binomial name
- Camponotus piceus (Leach, 1825)

= Camponotus piceus =

Species of ant

Camponotus piceus is a species of ant in the genus Camponotus, the carpenter ants, occurring in southern and central Europe, the southern part of eastern Europe, north-west Africa, Asia Minor, Lebanon, Iran, the Caucasus, and Kazakshtan.

It was originaly described as Formica picea by Leach in 1825, but was later moved to Camponotus and renamed piceus. Today Formica picea is instead used for an ant in the genus Formica.
