= Roy Snelling =

American entomologist (1934–2008)

Roy R. Snelling
- Born: September 30, 1934; Turlock, California
- Died: April 21, 2008 (aged 73); Kenya
- Known for: Hymenopteran studies
- Scientific career
- Fields: Entomology
- Institutions: Natural History Museum of Los Angeles County

Roy R. Snelling (September 30, 1934 — April 21, 2008) was an internationally renowned American entomologist who studied Hymenoptera, mainly ants, wasps and bees. He was an emeritus collections manager at the Natural History Museum of Los Angeles County where he worked for over 30 years, joining the museum in 1963 and retiring in 1993. He dedicated his professional life to making insect biodiversity better known and appreciated.

As a foremost myrmecologist, he is credited with many important finds of rare or new ant species, such as the first Aphaenogaster cockerelli as Novomessor cockerelli colony in California, Myrmecocystus tenuinodis Snelling 1976, Neivamyrmex wilsoni Snelling & Snelling 2007, and Myrmecocystus wheeleri, named by Snelling after the noted myrmecologist William Morton Wheeler, who was also William Steel Creighton's academic adviser. Snelling wrote that he was much influenced by W. S. Creighton's important 1950 volume The Ants of North America. In his career, Snelling would collaborate many times with Creighton, whose ant collection is now housed at the Natural History Museum of Los Angeles County.

Snelling studied at junior college in Modesto, California, but dropped out to become self-educated. Before going to the Natural History Museum of Los Angeles County, he spent time in the United States Army (1959) and as an inspector with the California Department of Food and Agriculture. Snelling also studied briefly at the University of Kansas but did not complete the graduate program.

Together with Charles Leonard Hogue, Snelling was a technical adviser for the Academy Award-winning film The Hellstrom Chronicle.

Many ant species have been named after Snelling, including:

- Azteca snellingi
- Camponotus snellingi
- Crematogaster snellingi
- Meranoplus snellingi
- Mycetophylax snellingi
- Pogonomyrmex snellingi
- Polyrhachis snellingi
- Stenamma snellingi
- Strumigenys snellingi
- Tetramorium snellingi
- Proceratium snellingi
