= Myrmecia nigra =

Scientific classification
- Kingdom: Animalia
- Phylum: Arthropoda
- Class: Insecta
- Order: Hymenoptera
- Family: Formicidae
- Subfamily: Myrmeciinae
- Genus: Myrmecia
- Species: M. nigra

Binomial name
- Myrmecia nigra Forel, 1907

Species of ant

Myrmecia nigra is an Australian ant which belongs to the genus Myrmecia. This species is native to Australia and is commonly distributed in Western Australia, notably in Perth.

Myrmecia nigra is a small bull ant species which usually only grow to 9.5-11 millimetres long. They are mainly black, and half of their mandibles are brown, the basal is half reddish yellow. The antennae and legs are brown, and the thorax varies in colour depending on the colony.
