= Myrmecia dimidiata =

Scientific classification
- Kingdom: Animalia
- Phylum: Arthropoda
- Class: Insecta
- Order: Hymenoptera
- Family: Formicidae
- Subfamily: Myrmeciinae
- Genus: Myrmecia
- Species: M. dimidiata

Binomial name
- Myrmecia dimidiata Clark, 1951

Species of ant

Myrmecia dimidiata is an Australian ant which belongs to the genus Myrmecia. This species is native to Australia. The Myrmecia dimidiata is distributed in the eastern states of Australia.

== Appearance ==
Myrmecia dimidiata is quite big. The worker ants are on average around 23-25 millimetres in length. They are usually a brownish red colour, but the antennae and legs are lighter. The mandibles are yellow.
