= Myrmecia hirsuta =

Scientific classification
- Kingdom: Animalia
- Phylum: Arthropoda
- Class: Insecta
- Order: Hymenoptera
- Family: Formicidae
- Subfamily: Myrmeciinae
- Genus: Myrmecia
- Species: M. hirsuta

Binomial name
- Myrmecia hirsuta Clark, 1951

Species of ant endemic to Australia

Myrmecia hirsuta is a species of bull ant, belonging to the 90 species in the genus Myrmecia. The species was described in 1951 by John Clark. Myrmecia hirsuta is distributed across the whole country of Australia, with their distribution is in most Australian states.

Workers are 21-33 millimetres long, and could be bigger. The head, jaws, antennae, thorax, legs, and most of their features are in a brownish red colour, with some black colouring as well. Their jaws are longer than their own head, like many other bull ant species.
