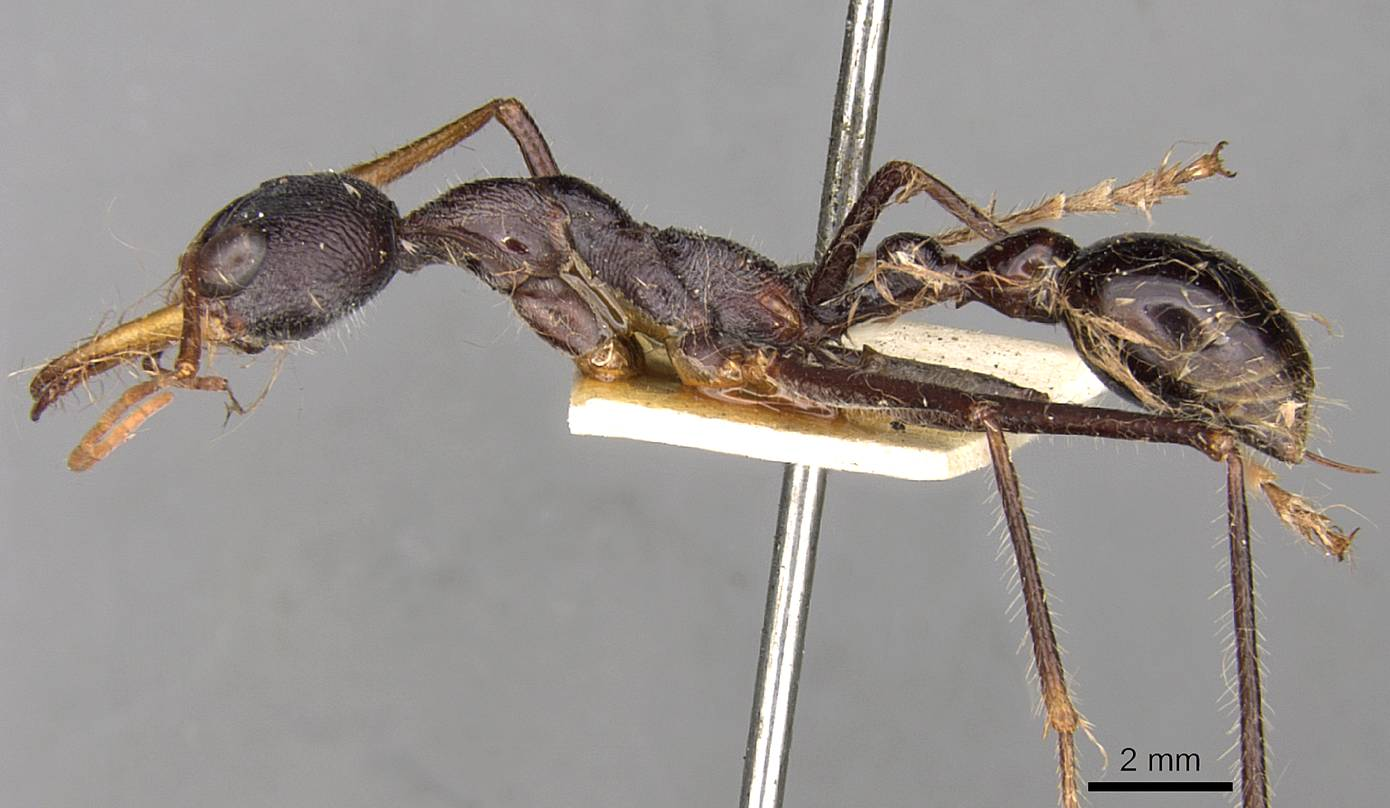
- Myrmecia arnoldi worker

Scientific classification
- Kingdom: Animalia
- Phylum: Arthropoda
- Class: Insecta
- Order: Hymenoptera
- Family: Formicidae
- Subfamily: Myrmeciinae
- Genus: Myrmecia
- Species: M. arnoldi

Binomial name
- Myrmecia arnoldi Clark, 1951

= Myrmecia arnoldi =

Species of ant

Myrmecia arnoldi is a bull ant of the genus Myrmecia. Like all bull ants except for one species in this genus, Myrmecia arnoldi is native to Australia.

== Description ==
The first specimens of the Myrmecia arnoldi were found in Western Australia and then described by John Clark in 1951. The length of the workers are 18-20 millimetres long. Their head and gasters are typically black, thorax and some other features are brown and their mandibles are yellow. Queens are typically larger and males are smaller, but information for these two castes are not very clear.
