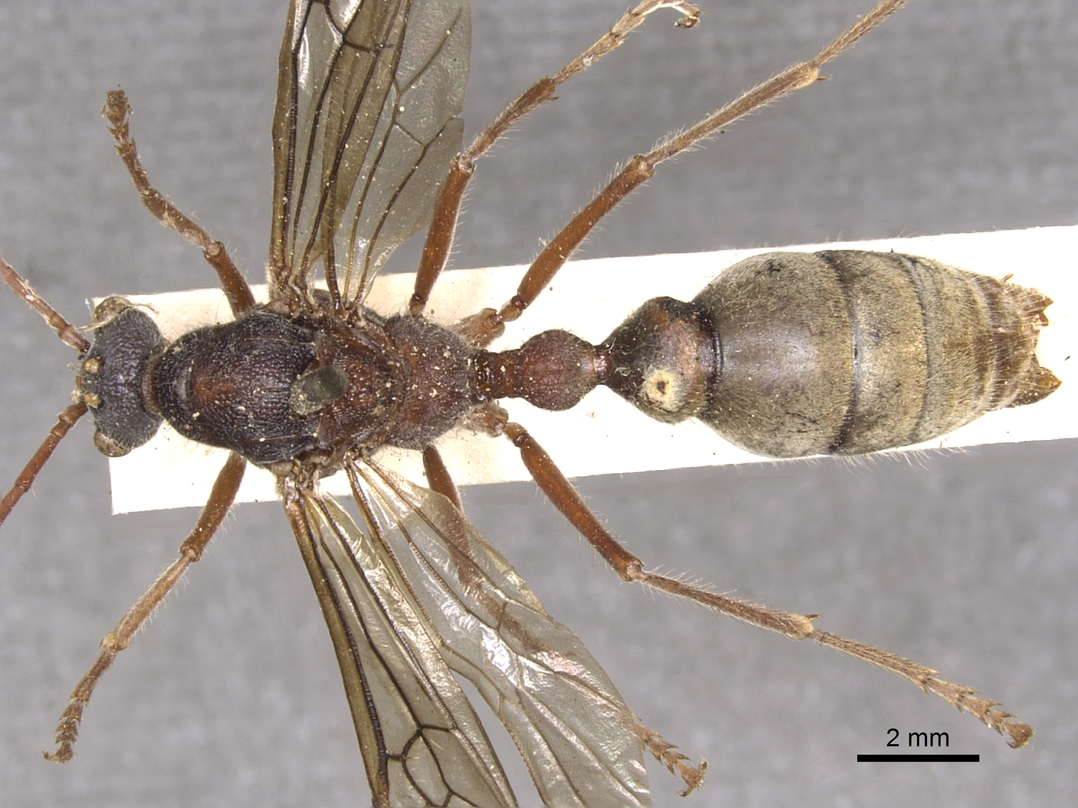
- Myrmecia auriventris male

Scientific classification
- Kingdom: Animalia
- Phylum: Arthropoda
- Class: Insecta
- Order: Hymenoptera
- Family: Formicidae
- Subfamily: Myrmeciinae
- Genus: Myrmecia
- Species: M. auriventris

Binomial name
- Myrmecia auriventris Mayr, 1870

= Myrmecia auriventris =

Species of ant

Myrmecia auriventris is an Australian ant which belongs to the genus Myrmecia. This species is endemic to Australia and is commonly distributed in Queensland.

Worker ants are typically 18-20 millimetres long. Drones are smaller at 15.5 millimetres. The head, pronotum, gaster, and other features are a black colour, while the node, epinotum, and metanotum is red. Other features like the mandibles, antennae and tarsi are a reddish yellow, while other parts are brown.
