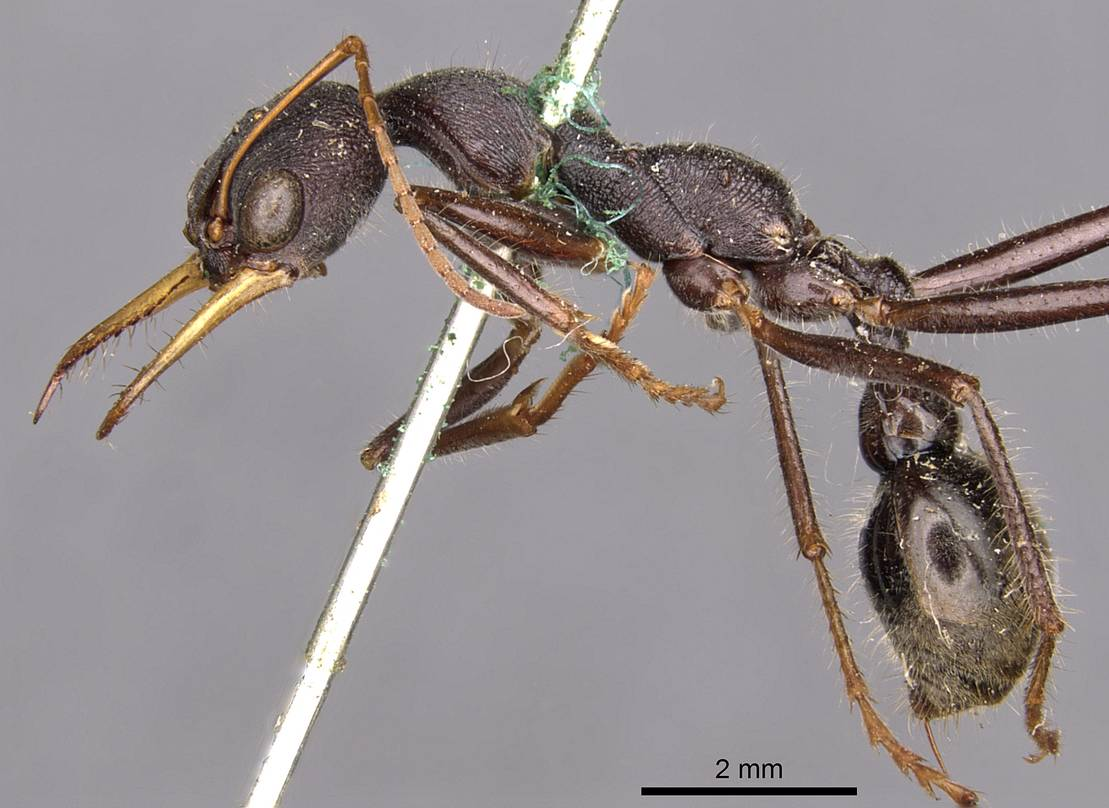

Scientific classification
- Kingdom: Animalia
- Phylum: Arthropoda
- Class: Insecta
- Order: Hymenoptera
- Family: Formicidae
- Subfamily: Myrmeciinae
- Genus: Myrmecia
- Species: M. rowlandi

Binomial name
- Myrmecia rowlandi Forel, 1910

Synonyms
- Myrmecia cordata Clark, 1951; Myrmecia cardigaster Brown, 1953; Myrmecia tarsata malandensis Forel, 1915

= Myrmecia rowlandi =

Species of ant

Myrmecia rowlandi is a species of bull ant native to Australia. They are usually spotted in the Australian state of Queensland, notably in Cairns.

== Notable features ==
Not much is known about Myrmecia rowlandi, but workers typically are 13-21 mm long. Their heads and thoraces are black, their legs are a brownish black colour, mandibles are yellow, and antennae are red.
