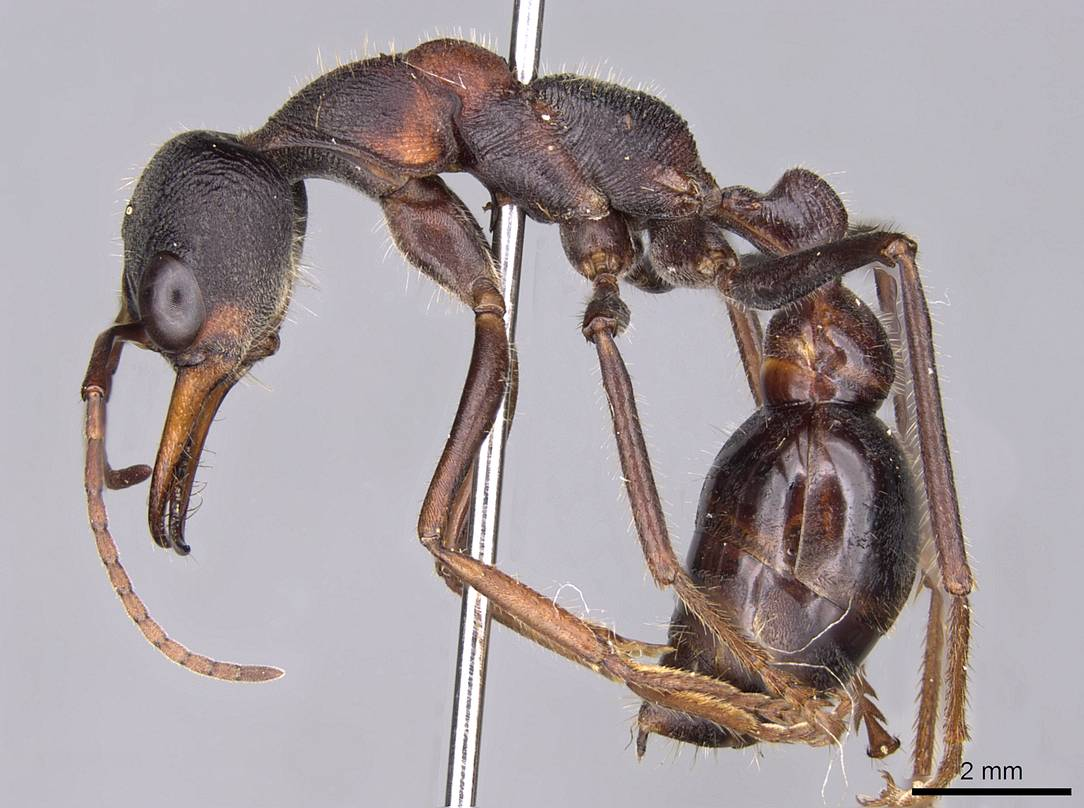

Scientific classification
- Kingdom: Animalia
- Phylum: Arthropoda
- Class: Insecta
- Order: Hymenoptera
- Family: Formicidae
- Subfamily: Myrmeciinae
- Genus: Myrmecia
- Species: M. pulchra

Binomial name
- Myrmecia pulchra Clark, 1929

= Myrmecia pulchra =

Species of ant

Myrmecia pulchra is an Australian bull ant species, a part of the genus Myrmecia. They are native to Australia. They are heavily distributed in Victoria, Australian Capital Territory, and New South Wales, notably around the coastlines.

The appearance of Myrmecia pulchra is that nearly the entire body is in a slightly light brown colour. The only exceptions is that the mandibles are slightly lighter and the thorax is completely black.
