= Myrmecia picticeps =

Scientific classification
- Kingdom: Animalia
- Phylum: Arthropoda
- Clade: Pancrustacea
- Class: Insecta
- Order: Hymenoptera
- Family: Formicidae
- Subfamily: Myrmeciinae
- Genus: Myrmecia
- Species: M. picticeps

Binomial name
- Myrmecia picticeps Clark, 1951

Species of ant

Myrmecia picticeps is an Australian ant which belongs to the genus Myrmecia. This species is native to Australia. Myrmecia picticeps has mostly been studied and found in the state of Western Australia. It was described by John S. Clark in 1951.

Myrmecia picticeps is a moderate sized bull ant with the workers are an average length of 18-19 millimetres. The head is red with some sort of brown colouring, the thorax, node and postpetiole are red, gaster is black, mandibles are a yellow colour, and the antennae and legs are a reddish-yellow colour
