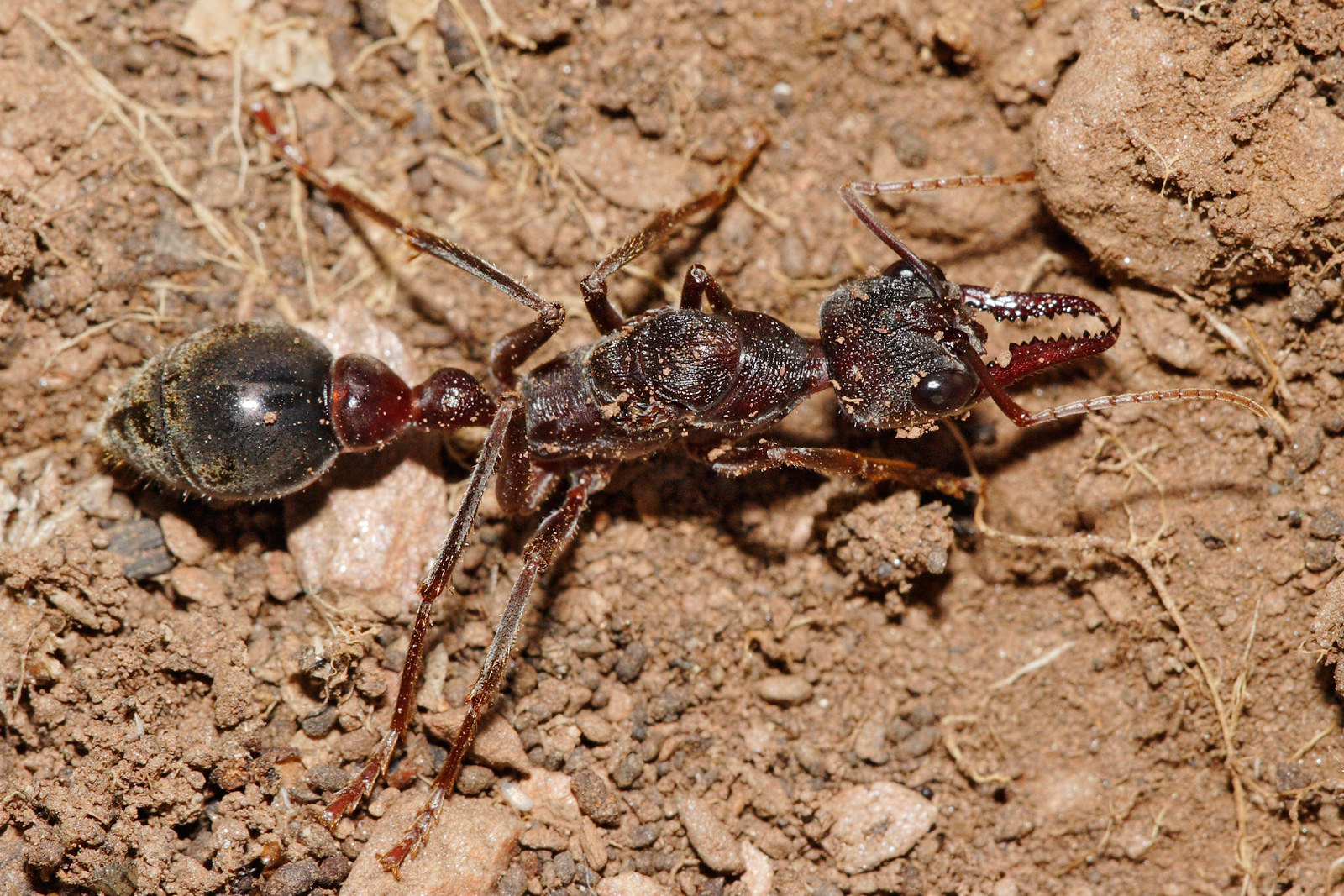
- Bull ant queen in Swifts Creek, Victoria

Scientific classification
- Kingdom: Animalia
- Phylum: Arthropoda
- Clade: Pancrustacea
- Class: Insecta
- Order: Hymenoptera
- Family: Formicidae
- Subfamily: Myrmeciinae
- Tribe: Myrmeciini; Emery, 1877
- Genus: Myrmecia; Fabricius, 1804

Type species
- Formica gulosa, now Myrmecia gulosa

Diversity
- c. 93 species
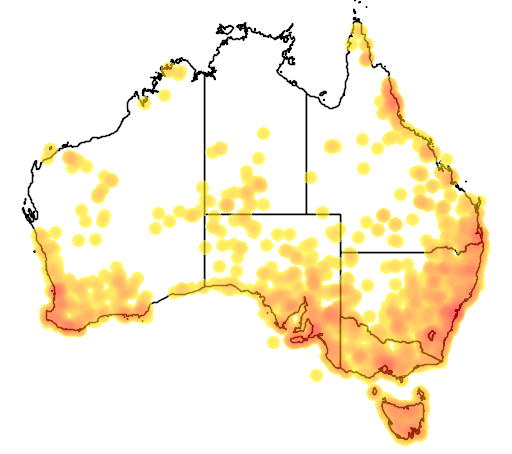
- Occurrences reported to the Atlas of Living Australia as of May 2015

Synonyms
- Halmamyrmecia Wheeler, 1922; Pristomyrmecia Emery, 1911; Promyrmecia Emery, 1911

= Myrmecia (ant) =

Genus of ants

Myrmecia is a genus of ants first established by Danish zoologist Johan Christian Fabricius in 1804. The genus is a member of the subfamily Myrmeciinae of the family Formicidae. Myrmecia is a large genus of ants, comprising at least 93 species that are found throughout Australia and its coastal islands, while a single species is only known from New Caledonia. One species has been introduced out of its natural distribution and was found in New Zealand in 1940, but the ant was last seen in 1981. These ants are commonly known as bull ants, bulldog ants or jack jumper ants, and are also associated with many other common names. They are characterized by their extreme aggressiveness, ferocity, and painful stings. Some species are known for the jumping behavior they exhibit when agitated.

Species of this genus are also characterized by their elongated mandibles and large compound eyes that provide excellent vision. They vary in colour and size, ranging from 8 to 40 millimetres (0.31 to 1.57 in). While workers and queens are hard to distinguish from each other due to their similar appearance, males are identifiable by their perceptibly smaller mandibles. Almost all Myrmecia species are monomorphic, with little variation among workers of a given species. Some queens are ergatoid and have no wings, while others have either stubby or completely developed wings. Nests are mostly found in soil, but they can be found in rotten wood and under rocks. One species does not nest in the ground at all; its colonies can only be found in trees.

A queen will mate with one or more males, and during colony foundation she will hunt for food until the brood have fully developed. The life cycle of the ant from egg to adult takes several months. Myrmecia workers exhibit greater longevity in comparison to other ants, and workers are also able to reproduce with male ants. Myrmecia is one of the most primitive group of ants on earth, exhibiting differentiated behaviors from other ants. Workers are solitary hunters and do not lead other workers to food. Adults are omnivores that feed on sweet substances, but the larvae are carnivores that feed on captured prey. Very few predators eat these ants due to their sting, but their larvae are often consumed by blindsnakes and echidnas, and a number of parasites infect both adults and brood. Some species are also effective pollinators.

Myrmecia stings are very potent, and the venom from these ants is among the most toxic in the insect world. In Tasmania, 3% of the human population are allergic to the venom of M. pilosula and can suffer life-threatening anaphylactic reactions if stung. People prone to severe allergic reactions can be treated with allergen immunotherapy (desensitisation).

== Etymology and common names ==
The generic name Myrmecia derives from Greek word Myrmec- (+ -ia), meaning "ant". In Western Australia, the Indigenous Australians called these ants kallili or killal.

Ants of this genus are popularly known as bulldog ants, bull ants, or jack jumper ants due to their ferocity and the way they hang off their victims using their mandibles, and also due to the jumping behaviour displayed by some species. Other common names include "inch ants", "sergeant ants", and "soldier ants". The jack jumper ant and other members of the Myrmecia pilosula species group are commonly known as "black jumpers", "hopper ants", "jumper ants", "jumping ants", "jumping jacks", and "skipper ants".

== Taxonomy and evolution ==
Genetic evidence suggests that Myrmecia diverged from related groups about 100 million years ago (Mya). The subfamily Myrmeciinae, to which Myrmecia belongs, is believed to have been found in the fossil record of 110 Mya ago. However, one study suggests that the age of the most recent common ancestor for Myrmecia and Nothomyrmecia is 74 Mya, and the subfamily is possibly younger than previously thought. Ants of the extinct genus Archimyrmex may possibly be the ancestor of Myrmecia. In the Evans' vespoid scala, Myrmecia and other primitive ant genera such as Amblyopone and Nothomyrmecia exhibit behavior which is similar to a clade of soil-dwelling families of vespoid wasps. Four species groups form a paraphyletic assemblage while five species groups form a monophyletic assemblage. The following cladogram shows the phylogenetic relationships within Myrmecia:

- Species groups of the genus Myrmecia
  - - Myrmecia nigrocincta species group
    - - M. gulosaspecies group
        Myrmecia midas
      - - Myrmecia nigriscapa
        - - Myrmecia esuriens
          - - Myrmecia brevinoda
            - - Myrmecia pulchra
              - Myrmecia rufinodis
        - - Myrmecia forceps
          - - Myrmecia tarsata
            - - Myrmecia eungellensis
              - Myrmecia fabricii
              - Myrmecia rowlandi
    - - - Myrmecia mandibularis species group
        - Myrmecia picta species group
        - Myrmecia urens species group
      - - Myrmecia aberrans species group
        - - Myrmecia pilosula species group
          - Myrmecia tepperi species group
          - Myrmecia cephalotes species group

=== Classification ===
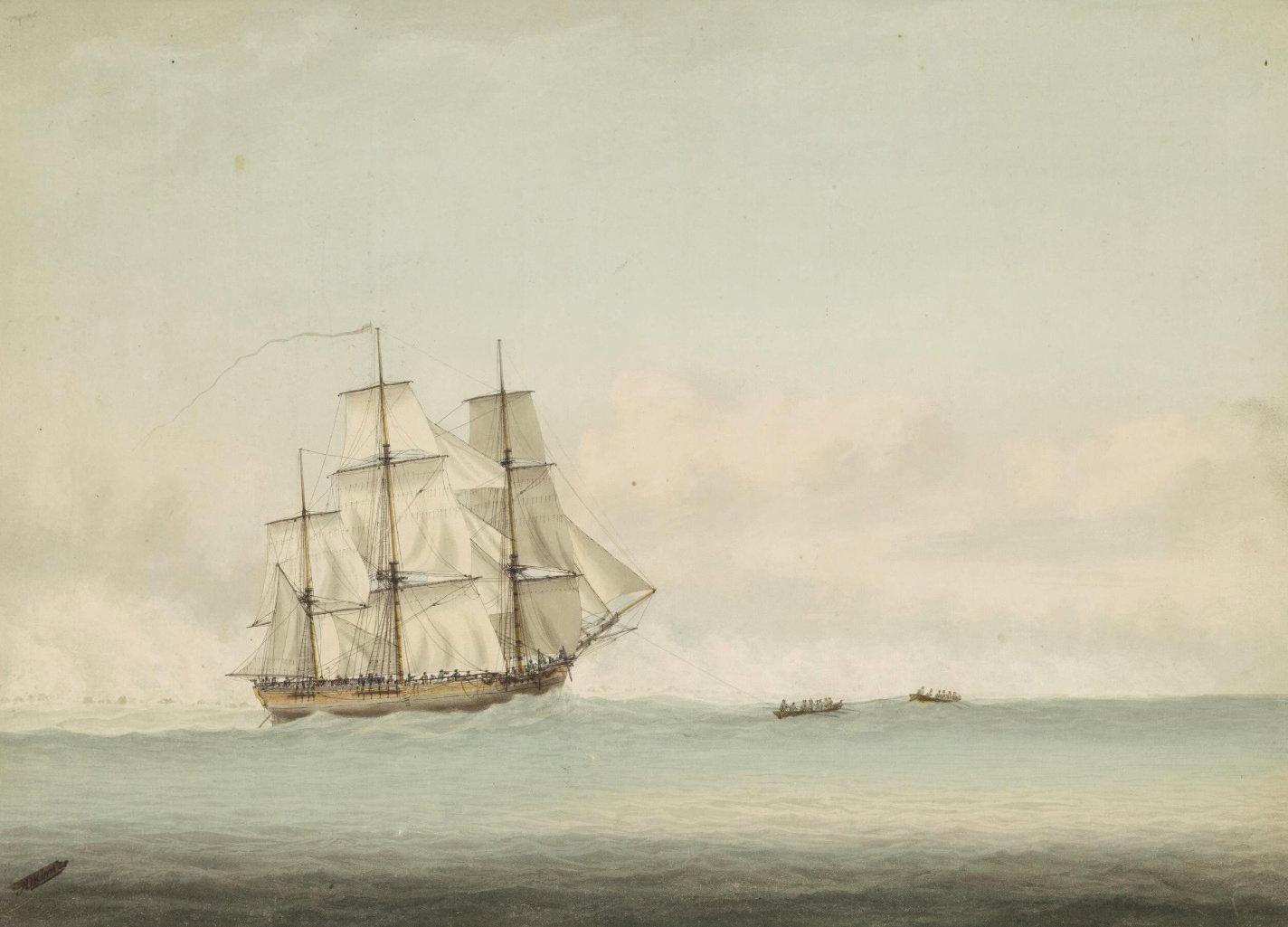
HMS Endeavour, the ship that Joseph Banks was on when he discovered M. gulosa

Myrmecia was first established by Danish zoologist Johan Christian Fabricius in his 1804 publication Systema Piezatorum, in which seven species from the genus Formica were placed into the genus along with the description of four new species. Myrmecia has been classified into numerous families and subfamilies; in 1858, British entomologist Frederick Smith placed it in the family Poneridae, subfamily Myrmicidae. It was placed in the subfamily Ponerinae by Austrian entomologist Gustav Mayr in 1862. This classification was short-lived as Mayr reclassified the genus into the subfamily Myrmicinae three years later. In 1877, Italian entomologist Carlo Emery classified the genus into the newly established subfamily Myrmeciidae, family Myrmicidae. Smith, who had originally established the Myrmicidae as a family in 1851, reclassified them as a subfamily in 1858. He again treated them as a family in 1871. Swiss myrmecologist Auguste Forel initially treated the Poneridae as a subfamily and classified Myrmecia as one of its constituent genera but later placed it in the Ponerinae. William H. Ashemad placed the genus in the subfamily Myrmeciinae in 1905, but it was later placed back in the Ponerinae in 1910 by American entomologist William Morton Wheeler. In 1954, Myrmecia was placed into the Myrmeciinae; this was the last time the genus was placed into a different ant subfamily.

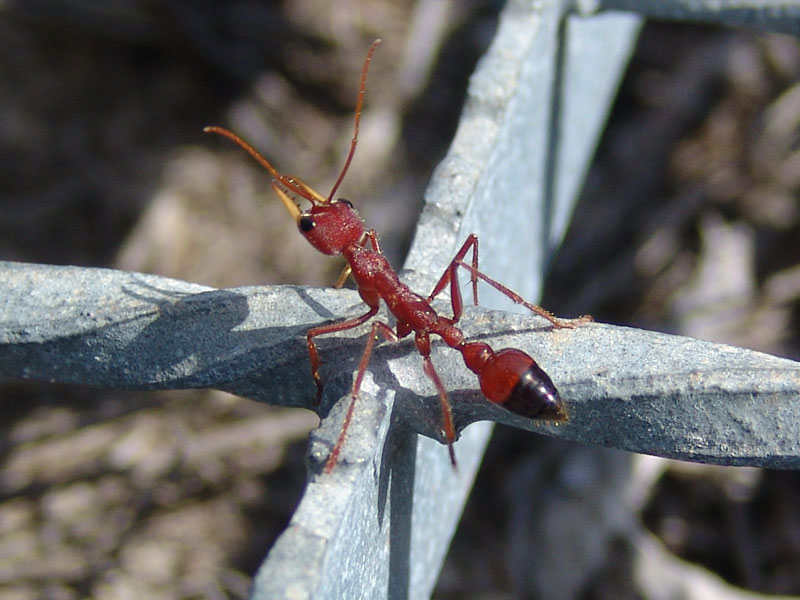
Joseph Banks is thought to have provided the first description of an ant of the genus Myrmecia when he collected and described a specimen of M. gulosa in 1770.

In 1911, Emery classified the subgenera Myrmecia, Pristomyrmecia, and Promyrmecia, based on the shape of their mandibles. (Note: Emery did not reclassify the actual genus itself as a subgenus. Instead, he named a subgenus after it.) Wheeler established the subgenus Halmamyrmecia, and the ants placed in it were characterized by their jumping behavior. The taxon Wheeler described was not referred to in his later publications, and the genera Halmamyrmecia and Pristomyrmecia were synonymised by John Clark. At the same time, Clark reclassified the subgenus Promyrmecia as a full genus. He revised the whole subfamily Myrmeciinae in 1951, recognizing 118 species and subspecies in Myrmecia and Promyrmecia; five species groups were assigned to Myrmecia and eight species groups to Promyrmecia. This revision was rejected by entomologist William Brown due to the lack of morphological evidence that would make the two genera distinct from each other. Due to this, Brown classified Promyrmecia as a synonym of Myrmecia in 1953. Clark's revision was the last major taxonomic study on the genus before 1991, and only a single species was described in the intervening years. In 2015, four new Myrmecia ants were described by Robert Taylor, all exclusive to Australia. Currently, 94 species are described in the genus, but as many as 130 species may exist.

Under the present classification, Myrmecia is the only extant genus in the tribe Myrmeciini, subfamily Myrmeciinae. It is a member of the family Formicidae in the order Hymenoptera. The type species for the genus is M. gulosa, discovered by Joseph Banks in 1770 during his expedition with James Cook on HMS Endeavour. M. gulosa is among the earliest Australian insects to be described, and the specimen Banks collected is housed in the Joseph Banks Collection in the Natural History Museum, London. M. gulosa was described by Fabricius in 1775 under the name Formica gulosa and later designated as the type species of Myrmecia in 1840.

=== Genetics ===
The number of chromosomes per individual varies from one to over 70 among the species in the genus. The genome of M. pilosula is contained on a single pair of chromosomes (males have just one chromosome, as they are haploid). This is the lowest number possible for any animal, and workers of this species are homologous. Like M. pilosula, M. croslandi also contains a single chromosome. While these ants only have a single chromosome, M. pyriformis contains 41 chromosomes, while M. brevinoda contains 42. The chromosome count for M. piliventris and M. fulvipes is two and 12, respectively. The genus Myrmecia retains many traits that are considered basal for all ants (i.e. workers foraging alone and relying on visual cues).

=== Species groups ===
Myrmecia contains a total of nine species groups. Originally, seven species groups were established in 1911, but this was raised to 13 in 1951; Promyrmecia had a total of eight, while Myrmecia only had five. M. maxima does not appear to be in a species group, as no type specimen is available. (Note: Despite M. maxima lacking a specimen, the description Moore provided undoubtedly describes a large Myrmecia species. He describes it as being "nearly an inch and a half long, having very sharp mandibles and a formidable sting, which produces very acute pain.")

A summary of the nine species groups described in the genus Myrmecia
| Group name | Common name | Example image | Description | Members |
|---|---|---|---|---|
| M. aberrans species group | Wide-jawed bull ants | | These medium-to-large ants are distinctive members of the genus. The mandibles and legs are short. They are found in the south-eastern region of Australia, and their colonies are small. Specimens have rarely been collected. | M. aberrans, M. formosa, M. forggatti, M. maura, and M. nobilis |
| M. cephalotes species group | —N/a | | These ants are characterised by their bright colours and black heads. Species of this group are medium in size and rare. Colonies dwell inland and they can be found in the eastern and western regions of Australia. | M. callima, M. cephalotes and M. hilli |
| M. gulosa species group | Giant bull ants | | Members of this group are large and slender, and have long legs. They are commonly found throughout most of Australia, although they are rarely or never found in the north-western coastal areas and Tasmania; one species has also been introduced to New Zealand. The mandibles vary in shape, and the number of teeth range from three to six. | M. analis, M. arnoldi, M. athertonensis, M. auriventris, M. borealis, M. brevinoda, M. browningi, M. comata, M. desertorum, M. dimidiata, M. erecta, M. esuriens, M. eungellensis, M. fabricii, M. ferruginea, M. flavicoma, M. forceps, M. forficata, M. fulgida, M. fuscipes, M. gratiosa, M. gulosa, M. hirsuta, Myrmecia inquilina, M. midas, M. minuscula, M. mjobergi, M. nigriceps, M. nigriscapa, M. pavida, M. picticeps, M. pulchra, M. pyriformis, M. regularis, M. rowlandi, M. rubripes, M. rufinodis, M. simillima, M. subfasciata, M. tarsata, M. tridentata, and M. vindex |
| M. mandibularis species group | Toothless bull ants | | The ants of this group are medium-sized, and can be distinguished from other Myrmecia ants by their oddly shaped mandibles. While their bodies are black, their appendages may vary in colour. They are known to live in the eastern regions of Australia and Tasmania. Colonies have also been found in the south coastal areas and Western Australia. | M. fulviculis, M. fulvipes, M. gilberti, M. luteiforceps, M. mandibularis, M. piliventris and M. potteri |
| M. nigrocincta species group | —N/a | | These ants are medium in size with slender bodies and long legs, confined to the east of Australia. Members of this group look similar to those of the M. gulosa species group. | M. flammicollis, M. nigrocincta, and M. petiolata |
| M. picta species group | —N/a | | These ants are small and can be found throughout southern Australia. This species group has only two members, making it the smallest of all the species groups. | M. fucosa and M. picta |
| M. pilosula species group | Jack jumper ants | | The majority of these ants are small in size, and colouration varies between species. They are distributed throughout Australia and Tasmania, and one member of this group is endemic to New Caledonia. The species group is known to be heterogeneous. | M. apicalis, M. banksi, M. chasei, M. chrysogaster, M. croslandi, M. cydista, M. dispar, M. elegans, M. harderi, M. haskinsorum, M. imaii, M. impaternata, M. ludlowi, M. michaelseni, M. occidentalis, M. pilosula, M. queenslandica, M. rugosa, and M. varians |
| M. tepperi species group | Buck-toothed bull ants | | These ants are small or medium-sized, and have similar characteristics to the M. pilosula group. They are found in the south-western and south-eastern regions of Australia. | M. acuta, M. clarki, M. swalei, M. tepperi, and M. testaceipes |
| M. urens species group | Baby bull ants | | Members of this group are all small, and colouration varies widely between species. Most specimens collected to date are from the coastal regions of Australia. | M. dichospila, M. exigua, M. infima, M. nigra, M. loweryi, M. rubicunda, and M. urens |

== Description ==
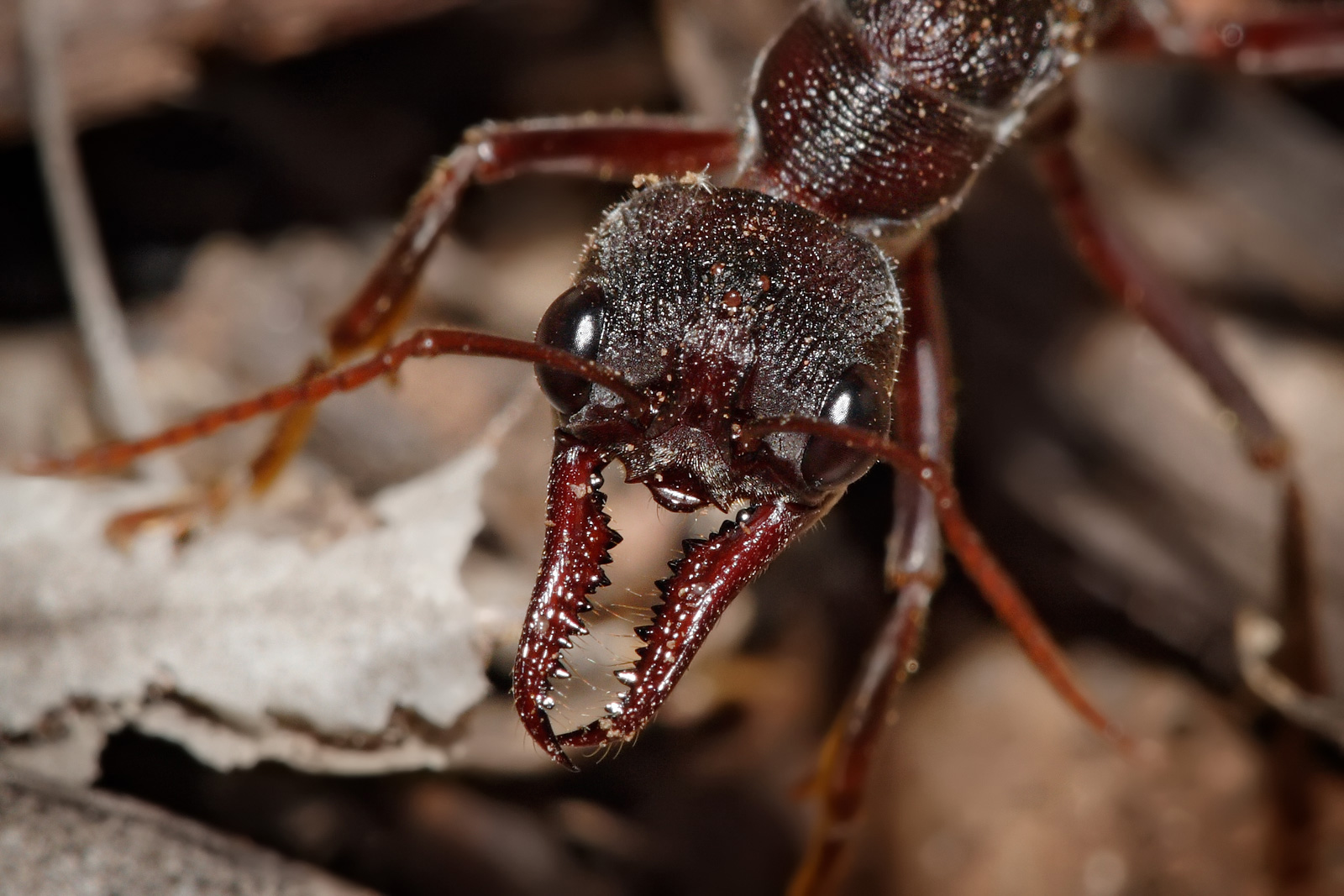
Bull ant showing the powerful mandibles and the relatively large compound eyes, which provide excellent vision

Myrmecia ants are easily noticeable due to their large mandibles, large compound eyes that provide excellent vision and a powerful sting that they use to kill prey. Each of their eyes contains 3,000 facets, making them the second largest in the ant world. Size varies widely, ranging from 8 to 40 mm (0.31 to 1.57 in) in length. The largest Myrmecia species is M. brevinoda, with workers measuring 37 mm (1.5 in); M. brevinoda workers are also the largest in the world. (Note: This does not include the measurements of queens of both M. brevinoda and other ants. Queens of other species are larger than these workers, with some measuring 52 mm (2.0 in).) Almost all species are monomorphic, but M. brevinoda is the only known species where polymorphism exists. It is well known that two worker subcastes exist, but this does not distinguish them as two different polymorphic forms. This may be due to the lack of food during winter and they could be incipient colonies. The division of labour is based on the size of ant, rather than its age, with the larger workers foraging for food or keeping guard outside the nest, while the smaller workers tend to the brood.

Their colouration is variable; black combined with red and yellow is a common pattern, and many species have golden-coloured pubescence (hair). Many other species are brightly coloured which warns predators to avoid them. The formicine ant Camponotus bendigensis is similar in appearance to M. fulvipes, and data suggest C. bengdigensis is a batesian mimic of M. fulvipes. The number of malpighian tubules differs between castes; in M. dispar, males have 16 tubules, queens range from 23 to 26, and workers have 21 to 29.

Worker ants are usually the same size as each other, although this is not true for some species; worker ants of M. brevinoda, for example, vary in length from 13 to 37 mm (0.51 to 1.46 in). The mandibles of the workers are long with a number of teeth, and the clypeus is short. The antennae consist of 12 segments and the eyes are large and convex. Based on a study on the antennal sensory of M. pyriformis, the antennal sensilla are known to have eight types. Large ocelli are always present.

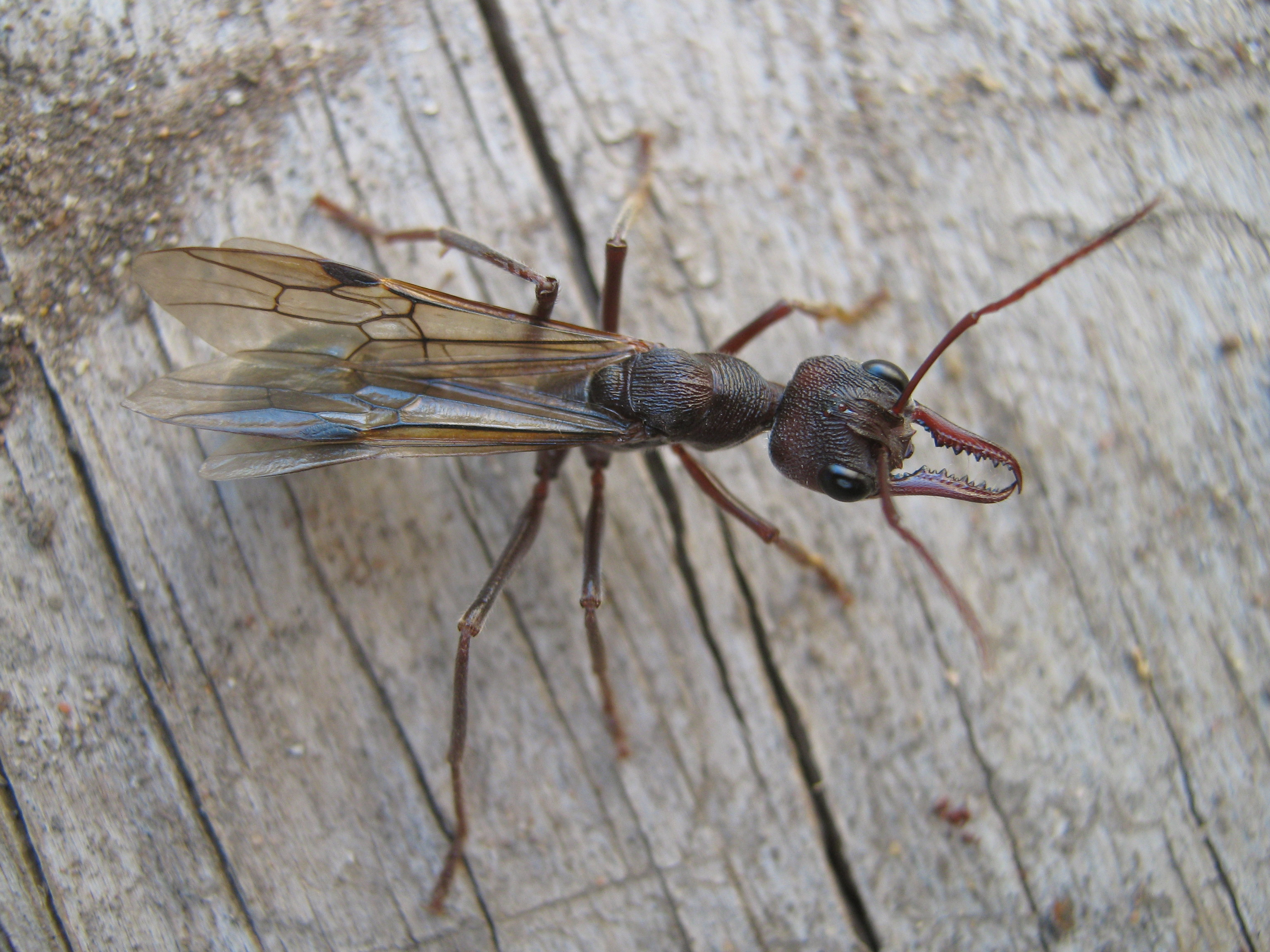
A winged female bulldog ant in Kialla, Victoria

Queens are usually larger than the workers, but are similar in colour and body shape. The head, node, and postpetiole are broader in the queen, and the mandibles are shorter and also broad. Myrmecia queens are unique in that particular species either have fully winged queens, queens with poorly developed wings, or queens without any wings. For example, M. aberrans and M. esuriens queens are ergatoid, meaning that they are wingless. Completely excavated nests showed no evidence of any winged queen residing within them. Some species have queens which are subapterous, meaning they are either wingless or only have rudiments of wings; the queens can be well developed with or without these wing buds. M. nigrocincta and M. tarsata are "brachypterous", where queens have small and rudimentary wings which render the queen flightless. Dealated queens with developed wings and thoraces are considered rare. In some species, such as M. brevinoda and M. pilosula, three forms of queens exist, with the dealated queens being the most recognisable.

Males are easy to identify due to their perceptibly broad and smaller mandibles. Their antennae consist of 13 segments, and are almost the same length as the ants' bodies. Ergatandromorph (an ant that exhibits both male and worker characteristics) males are known; in 1985, a male M. gulosa was collected before it hatched from its cocoon, and it had a long but excessively curved left mandible while the other mandible was small. On the right side of its body, it was structurally male, but the left side appeared female. The head was also longer on the female side, its colour was darker, and the legs and prothorax were smaller on the male side. Male genitalia are retracted into a genital cavity that is located in the posterior end of the gaster. The sperm is structurally the same to other animal sperm, forming an oval head with a long tail.

Among the largest larvae examined were those of M. simillima, reaching lengths of 35 mm (1.4 in). The pupae are enclosed in dark cocoons.

== Distribution and habitat ==
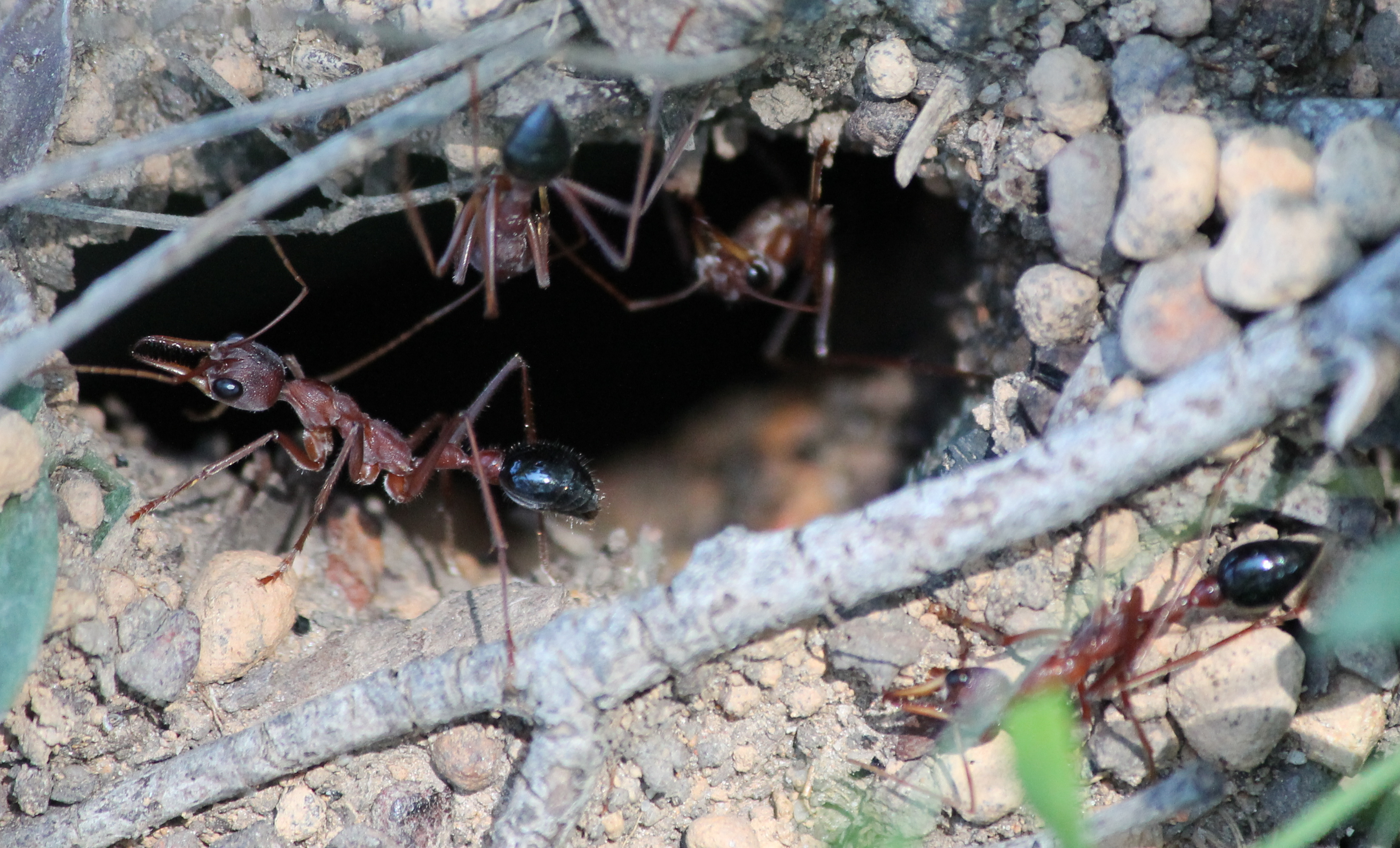
Myrmecia nest in the lateritic soils of the Darling Range, Western Australia

Almost all species in the genus Myrmecia are found in Australia and its coastal islands. M. apicalis is the only species not native to Australia and is only found in the Isle of Pines, New Caledonia. Only one ant has ever established nests outside its native range; M. brevinoda was first discovered in New Zealand in 1940 and the ant was recorded in Devonport in Auckland in 1948, 1965 and 1981 where a single nest was destroyed. Sources suggest the ant was introduced to New Zealand through human activity; they were found inside a wooden crate brought from Australia. While no eradication attempt was made by the New Zealand government, the ant has not been found in the country since 1981 and is presumed to have been eradicated.

Ants of this genus prefer to inhabit grasslands, forests, heath, urban areas and woodland. Nests are found in Callitris forest, dry marri forest, Eucalyptus woodland and forests, mallee scrub, in paddocks, riparian woodland, and wet and dry sclerophyll forests. They also live in dry sandplains, and coastal plain. When a queen establishes a new colony, the nest is at first quite simple structurally. The nest gradually expands as the colony grows larger. Nests can be found in debris, decaying tree stumps, rotten logs, rocks, sand, and soil, and under stones. While most species nest underground, M. mjobergi is an arboreal nesting species found on epiphytic ferns of the genus Platycerium. Two types of nests have been described for this genus: a simple nest with a noticeable shaft inside, and a complex structure surrounded by a mound. Some species construct dome-shaped mounds containing a single entrance, but some nests have numerous holes that are constantly used and can extend several metres underground. Sometimes, these mounds can be 0.5 m (20 in) high. Workers decorate these nests with a variety of items, including charcoal, leaves, plant fragments, pebbles, and twigs. Some ants use the warmth by decorating their nests with dry materials that heat quickly, providing the nest with solar energy traps.

== Behaviour and ecology ==
=== Foraging ===
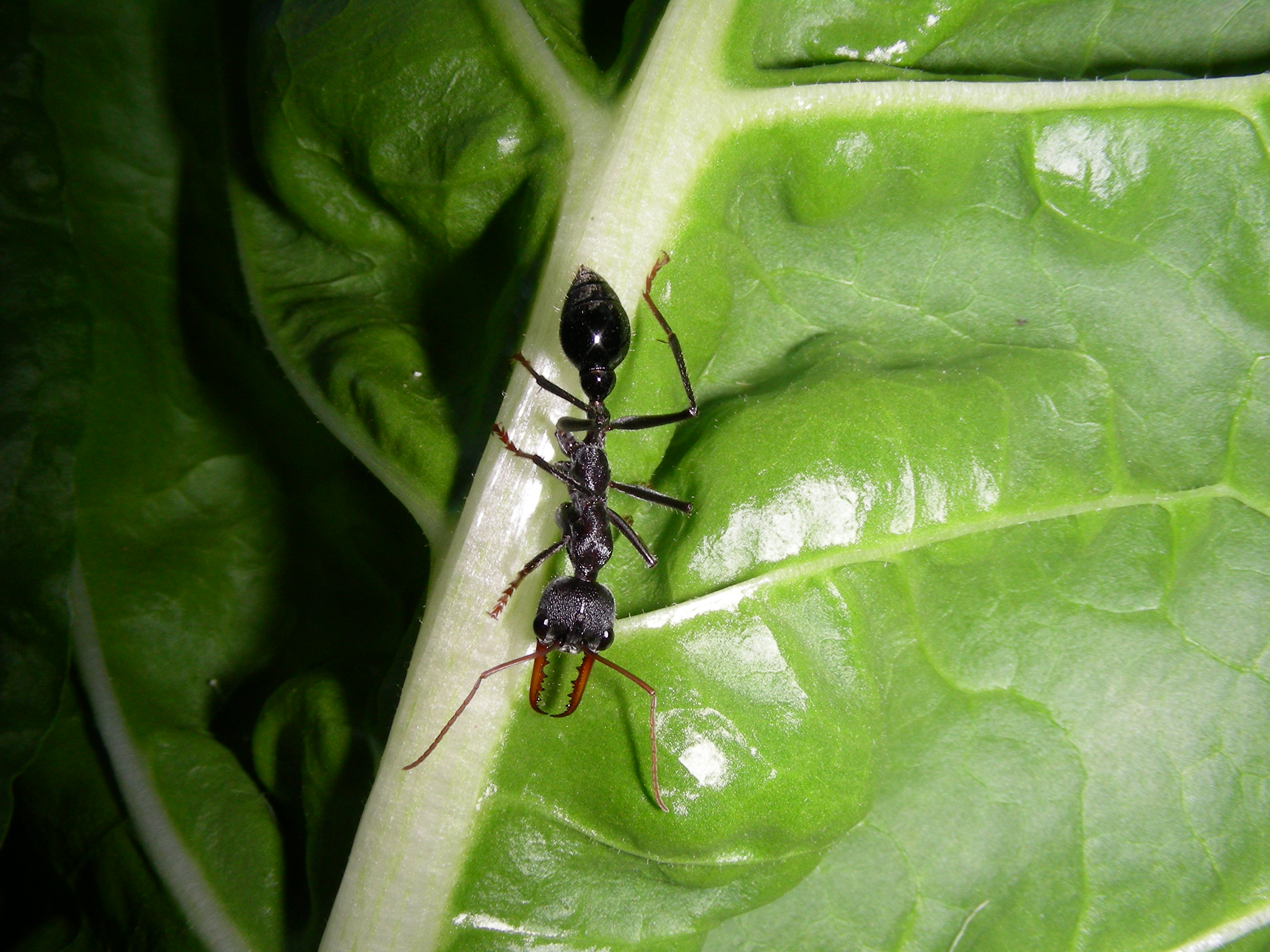
M. simillima foraging on a leaf in a vegetable garden

The genus Myrmecia is among the most primitive of all known living ants, and ants of the genus are considered specialist predators. Unlike most ants, workers are solitary hunters, and do not lay pheromone trails; nor do they recruit others to food. Tandem running does not occur, and workers carrying other workers as a method of transportation is rare or awkwardly executed. Although Myrmecia is not known to lay pheromone trails to food, M. gulosa is capable of inducing territorial alarm using pheromones while M. pilosula can attack en masse, suggesting these ants can also induce alarm pheromones. M. gulosa induces territorial alarm behaviour using pheromones from three sources; an alerting substance from the rectal sac, a pheromone found in the Dufour's gland, and an attack pheromone from the mandibular gland. Despite Myrmecia ants being among the most primitive ants, they exhibit some behaviours considered "advanced"; adults will sometimes groom each other and the brood, and distinct nest odors exist for each colony.

Most species are diurnal, and forage on the ground or onto low vegetation in search of food, but a few are nocturnal and only forage at night. Most Myrmecia ants are active during the warmer months, and are dormant during winter. However, M. pyriformis is a nocturnal species that is active throughout the whole year. M. pyriformis also has a unique foraging schedule; 65% of individuals who went out to forage left the nest in 40–60 minutes, while 60% of workers would return to the nest in the same duration of time at dusk. Foraging workers rely on landmarks for navigation back home. If displaced a short distance, they will scan their surroundings, and then rapidly move in the direction of the nest. M. vindex ants carry dead nest-mates out of their nests and place them on refuse piles, a behaviour known as necrophoresis.

=== Pollination ===
While pollination by ants is somewhat rare, several Myrmecia species have been observed pollinating flowers. For example, the orchid Leporella fimbriata is a myrmecophyte which can only be pollinated by the winged male ant M. urens. Pollination of this orchid usually occurs between April and June during warm afternoons, and may take several days until the short-lived males all die. The flower mimics M. urens queens, so the males move from flower to flower in an attempt to copulate with it. M. nigrocincta workers have been recorded visiting flowers of Eucalyptus regnans and Senna acclinis, and are considered a potential pollination vector for E. regnans trees. Although Senna acclinis is self-compatible, the inability of M. nigrocincta to appropriately release pollen would restrict its capacity to effect pollination. Foraging M. pilosula workers are regularly observed on the inflorescences of Prasophyllum alpinum (mostly pollinated by wasps of the family Ichneumonidae). Although pollinia are often seen in the ants' jaw, they have a habit of cleaning their mandibles on the leaves and stems of nectar-rich plants before moving on, preventing pollen exchange. Whether M. pilosula contributes to pollination is unknown.

=== Diet ===
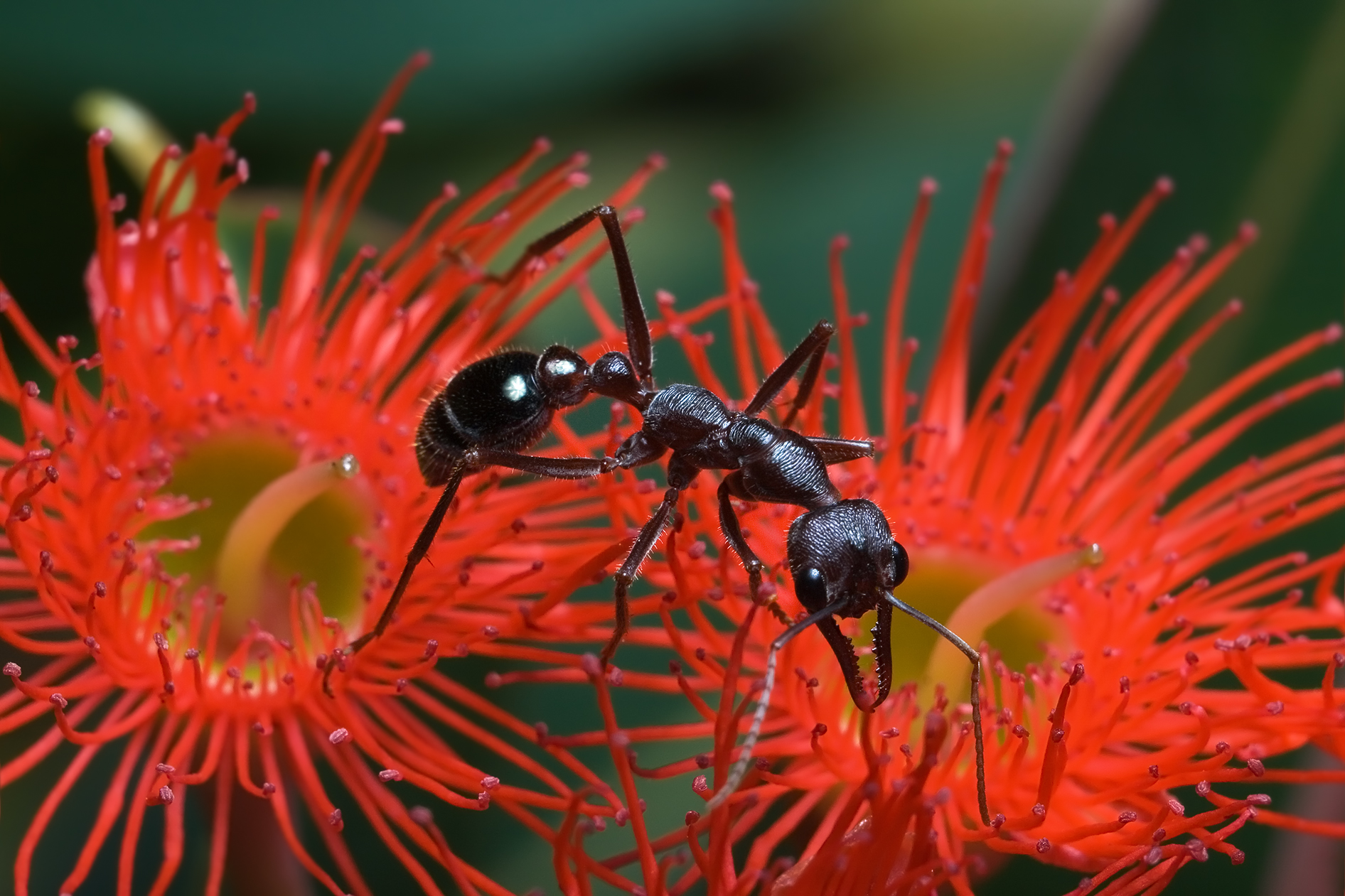
M. forficata feeding on a flowering Corymbia ficifolia

Despite their ferocity, adults are nectarivores, consuming honeydew (a sweet, sticky liquid found on leaves, deposited from various insects), nectar, and other sweet substances. The larvae, however, are carnivorous. After they reach a certain size, they are fed insects that foragers capture and kill. The workers also regurgitate food for other ants to consume. Young ants are rarely fed food regurgitated by adults. Adult workers prey on a variety of insects and arthropods, such as beetles, caterpillars, earwigs, Ithone fusca, Perga sawflies, and spiders. Other prey include invertebrates such as bees, cockroaches, crickets, wasps and other ants; in particular, workers prey on Orthocrema ants (a subgenus of Crematogaster) and Camponotus, although this is risky since these ants are able to call for help through chemical signals. Slaters, earthworms, scale insects, frogs, lizards, grass seeds, possum feces and kangaroo feces are also collected as food. Flies such as the housefly and blowfly are consumed. Some species, such as M. pilosula, will only attack small fly species and ignore larger ones. Nests of the social spider Delena cancerides are often invaded by M. pyriformis ants, and nests once housing these spiders are filled with debris such as twigs and leaves by the workers, rendering them useless. These "scorched earth" tactics prevent the spiders competing with the ants. M. gulosa attacks Christmas beetles, but workers later bury them.

Myrmecia is one of the very few genera where the workers lay trophic eggs, or infertile eggs laid as food for viable offspring. Workers laying trophic eggs have only been reported in two species; these species are M. forceps and M. gulosa. Depending on the species, colonies specialise in trophallaxis; queens and larvae eat eggs that are laid by worker individuals, but the workers do not feed on eggs. Neither adults nor larvae consume food during winter, but cannibalism among larvae is known to occur throughout the year. The larvae only cannibalise each other; this is most likely to happen when no dead insects are available.

=== Predators, parasites and associations ===
Myrmecia ants deter many potential predators due to their sting. The blindsnake Ramphotyphlops nigrescens consumes the larvae and pupae of Myrmecia, while avoiding the potent sting of the adults, which it is vulnerable to. The short-beaked echidna (Tachyglossus aculeatus) also eats the eggs and larvae. Nymphs of the assassin bug species Ptilocnemus lemur lure these ants to themselves by trying to make the ant sting them, by waving its hind legs around to attract a potential prey item. Body remains of Myrmecia have been found in the stomach contents of the eastern yellow robin (Eopsaltria australis). The Australian magpie (Gymnorhina tibicen), the black currawong (Strepera versicolor), and the white-winged chough (Corcorax melanorhamphos) prey on these ants, but few are successfully taken.

The host association between Myrmecia and eucharitid wasps began several million years ago; M. forficata larvae are the host to Austeucharis myrmeciae, being the first recorded eucharitid parasitoid of an ant, and Austeucharis fasciiventris is a parasitoid to M. gulosa pupae. M. pilosula is affected by a gregarines parasite that changes an ant's colour from their typical black appearance to brown. This was discovered when brown workers were dissected and found to have gregarinasina spores, while black workers showed no spores. Another unidentified gregarine parasite is known to infect the larvae of M. pilosula and other Myrmecia species. This gregarine parasite also softens the ant's cuticle. Other parasites include Beauveria bassiana, Purpureocillium lilacinum (formerly known as Paecilomyces lilacinus), Chalcura affinis, Tricoryna wasps, and various mermithid nematodes.

M. hirsuta and M. inquilina are the only known species in this genus that are inquilines and live in other Myrmecia colonies. An M. inquilina queen has been found in an M. vindex colony. Myrmecia is a larval attendant to the butterfly Theclinesthes serpentata (saltbush blue), while some species, particularly M. nigrocincta, enslave other ant species, notably those in the genus Leptomyrmex. M. nigriceps ants are able to enter another colony of the same species without being attacked, as they may be unable to recognise alien conspecifics, nor do they try to distinguish nestmates from ants of another colony. Formicoxenus provancheri and M. brevinoda share a form of symbiotic relationship known as xenobiosis, where one species of ant will live with another and raise their young separately, with M. brevinoda being the host. (Note: Most likely observed in captive colonies, as F. provancheri is not native to Australia and is only found in Canada and the United States.) Solenopsis may sometimes nest in Myrmecia colonies, as a single colony was found to have three or four Solenopsis nests inside. Lagria beetles and rove beetles in the genus Heterothops dwell inside colonies and skinks and frogs have also been found living unharmed within Myrmecia nests. Metacrinia nichollsi, for example, has been reported living inside M. regularis colonies.

=== Life cycle ===
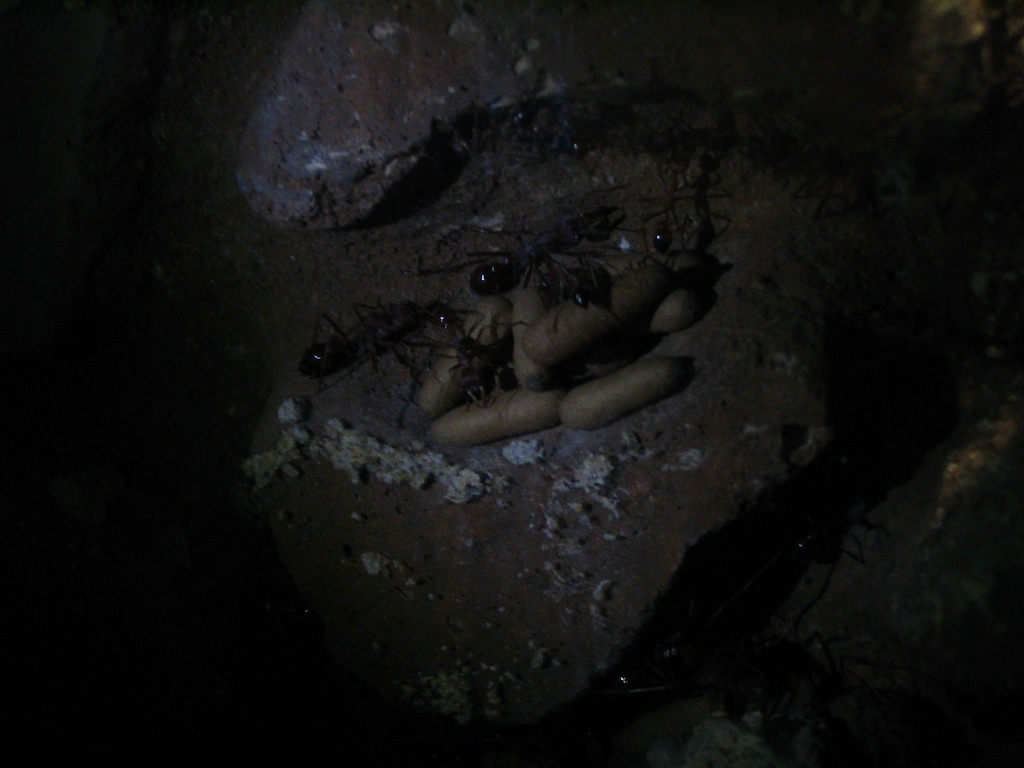
Captive colony with pupae

Like other ants, Myrmecia ants begin as an egg. If the egg is fertilised, the ant becomes a diploid female; if not, it becomes a haploid male. They develop through complete metamorphosis, meaning that they pass through larval and pupal stages before emerging as adults.

During the process of founding a colony, as many as four queens cooperate with each other to find a suitable nesting ground, but after the first generation of workers is born, they fight each other until one queen is left alive. However, occasional colonies are known to have as many as six queens coexisting peacefully in the presence of workers. A queen searches for a suitable nest site to establish her colony, and excavates a small chamber in the soil or under logs and rocks, where she takes care of her young. A queen also hunts for prey instead of staying in her nest, a behaviour known as claustral colony founding. Although queens do provide sufficient amounts of food to feed their larvae, the first workers are "nanitics" (or minims), smaller than the smallest workers encountered in older developed colonies. Several species do not have any worker caste, and solitary queens will raid a colony, kill the residing queen, and take over the colony. The first generation of workers may take a while to fully develop into adults; for example, M. forficata eggs take around 100 days to fully develop, while other species may take up to eight months.

Queens lay around eight eggs, but less than half of these eggs develop. Some species, such as M. simillima and M. gulosa, lay their eggs singly on the colony floor, while M. pilosula ants may lay eggs in a clump. These clumps have two to 30 eggs each with no larvae present. Certain Myrmecia species do not lay their eggs singly and form clumps of eggs, instead. The larvae are capable of crawling short distances without the assistance of adult workers, and workers will cover the larvae in dirt to help them spin into a cocoon. If cocoons are isolated from a colony, they are capable of shedding their skins before hatching, allowing themselves to advance to full pigmentation. Sometimes, a newborn can emerge from its pupa without the assistance of other ants. Once these ants are born, they are able to identify distinct tasks, a well known primitive trait. Myrmecia lifespans vary in each species, but their longevity is greater than many ant genera: M. nigrocincta and M. pilosula have a lifespan of one year, while M. nigriceps workers can live up to 2.2 years. The oldest recorded worker was a M. vindex, living up to 2.6 years. If a colony is deprived of workers, queens are able to revert to colony-founding behaviours until a sustainable workforce emerges. A colony may also emigrate to a new nesting spot altogether.

=== Reproduction ===
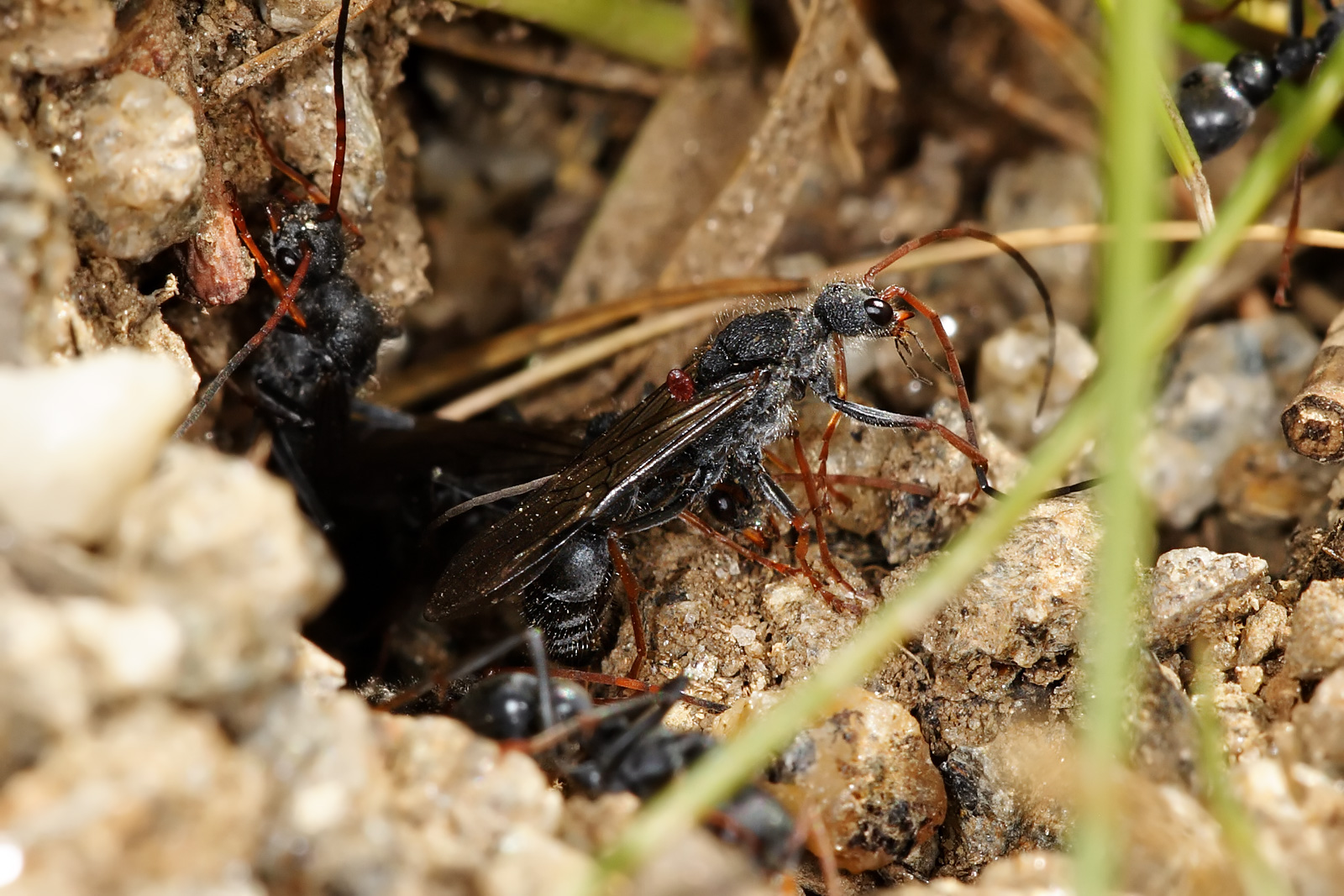
Drones (males) emerging from their nest

Winged, virgin queens and males, known as alates, appear in colonies during January, before their nuptial flight. Twenty females or fewer are found in a single colony, while males are much more common. The nuptial flight begins at different times for each species; they have been recorded in mid-summer to autumn (January to early April), but there is one case of a nuptial flight occurring from May to July. Ideal conditions for nuptial flight are hot stormy days with windspeeds of 30 km/h (18 mi/h) and temperatures reaching 30 °C (86 °F), and elevations of 91 metres (300 ft). Nuptial flights are rarely recorded due to queens leaving their nest singly, although as many as four queens may leave the nest at the same time. Species are both polygynous and polyandrous, with queens mating with one to ten males. Polygynous and polyandrous societies can occur in a single nest, but particular species are either primarily polygynous or primarily polyandrous. For example, nearly 80% of tested M. pilosula colonies are polygynous while M. pyriformis colonies are mostly polyandrous. Nuptial flight takes place during the morning and can last until late afternoon. When the alates leave the nest, most species launch themselves into the air from trees and shrubs, although others launch themselves off the ground. Queens discharge a glandular secretion from the tergal gland, which males are strongly attracted to. As many as 1,000 alates will gather to mate. A queen was once found to have five or six males attempting to copulate with her. The queen is unable to bear the weight of the large number of males trying to mate with her, and will drop to the ground, with the ants dispersing later on. M. pulchra queens are ergatoid and cannot fly; the males meet the queen out in an open area away from the nest and mate, and these queens do not return to their nest after mating.

Both independent and dependent colony foundation can occur after mating. Isolation by distance (IBD) patterns have been recorded with M. pilosula queens, where nests that tend to be closer together were more genetically related to each other in comparison to other nests further away. Independent colony foundation is closely associated with queens which engage in nuptial flight in areas far from their home colony, showing that dependent colony foundation mostly occurs if they mate near their nest. In some cases, queens could seek adoption into alien colonies if there are no suitable areas to find a nest or independent colony foundation cannot be carried out. Other queens could try to return to their home nest after nuptial flight, but they may end up in another nest near the nest they originally came from. In multiple-queen societies, the egg-laying queens are generally unrelated to one another, but one study showed that it is possible for multiple queens in the same colony to be genetically related to each other. Depending on the species, the number of individuals present in a colony can range from 50 to over 2,200 individuals. A colony with less than 100 workers is not considered a mature colony. M. dispar colonies have around 15 to 329 ants, M. nigrocincta have over 1,000, M. pyriformis have from 200 to over 1,400 and M. gulosa have nearly 1,600. A colony can last for a number of years. Foraging behaviour among smaller workers which never usually leave the nest can be a sign of a colony's impending demise.

Workers are known to produce their own eggs, but these eggs are unfertilised and hatch into male ants. There is a chance of workers attacking a particular individual who has successfully produced male offspring due to a change in a workers cuticular hydrocarbon; cuticular hydrocarbons are believed to play a vital role in the regulation of reproduction. However, this is not always the case. Myrmecia is one of several ant genera which possess gamergate workers, where a female worker is able to reproduce with mature males when the colony is lacking a queen. Myrmecia workers are highly fertile and can successfully mate with males. A colony of M. pyriformis without a queen was collected in 1998 and kept in captivity, during which time the gamergates produced viable workers for three years. Ovarian dissections showed that three workers of this colony mated with males and produced female workers. Queens have bigger ovaries than the workers, with 44 ovarioles while workers have 8 to 14. Spermatheca is present in M. gulosa workers, based on eight dissected individuals showing a spermatheca structurally similar to those found in queens. These spermathecas did not have any sperm. Why the queen was not replaced is still unknown.

=== Vision ===
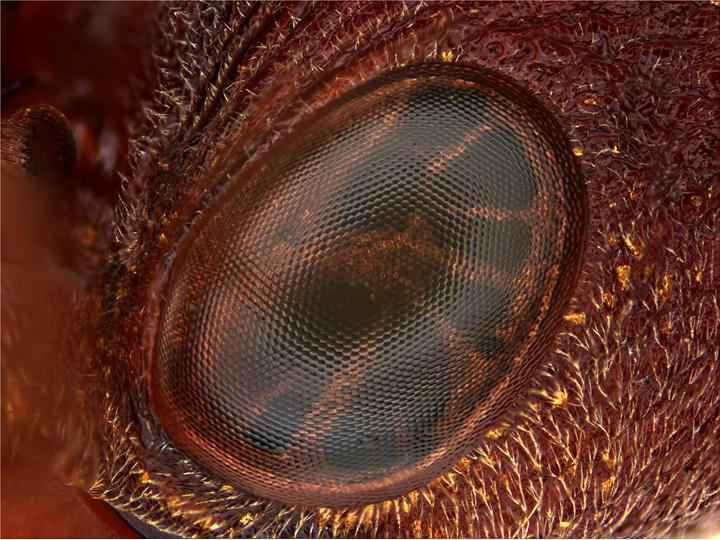
Closeup view of a bull ant eye

While most ants have poor eyesight, Myrmecia ants have excellent vision. This trait is important to them, since Myrmecia primarily relies on visual cues for navigation. These ants are capable of discriminating the distance and size of objects moving nearly a metre away. Winged alates are only active during the day, as they can see better. Members of a colony have different eye structures due to each individual fulfilling different tasks, and nocturnal species have larger ommatidia in comparison to those that are active during the day. Facet lenses also vary in size; for example, the diurnal species M. croslandi has a smaller lens in comparison to M. nigriceps and M. pyriformis which have larger lenses. Myrmecia ants have three photoreceptors that can see UV light, meaning they are capable of seeing colours that humans cannot. Their vision is said to be better than some mammals, such as cats, dogs or wallabies. Despite their excellent vision, worker ants of this genus find it difficult to find their nests at night, due to the difficulty of finding the landmarks they use to navigate. They are thus more likely to return to their nests the following morning, walking slowly with long pauses.

=== Sting ===
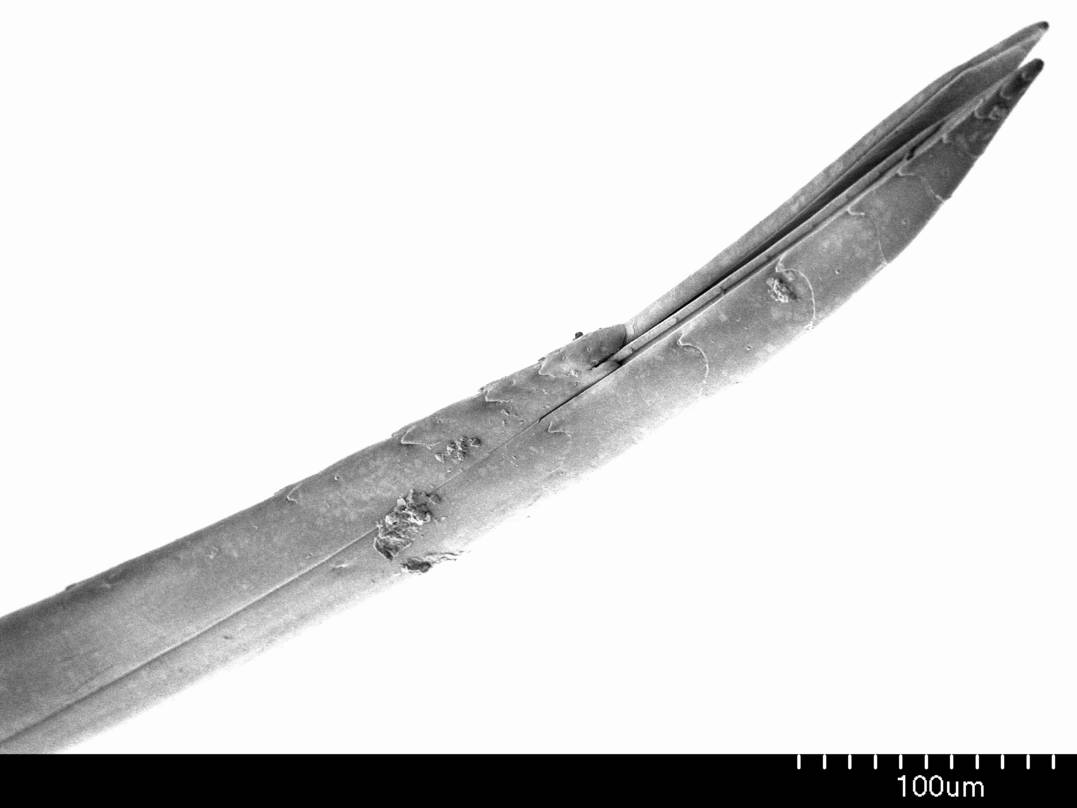
Stinger of M. nigriscapa

Myrmecia workers and queens possess a sting described as "sharp in pain with no burning." The pain may last for several minutes. In the Starr sting pain scale, a scale which compares the overall pain of hymenopteran stings on a four-point scale, Myrmecia stings were ranked from 2–3 in pain, described as "painful" or "sharply and seriously painful". Unlike in honeybees, the sting lacks barbs, and so the stinger is not left in the area the ant has stung, allowing the ants to sting repeatedly without any harm to themselves. The retractable sting is located in their abdomen, attached to a single venom gland connected by the venom sac, which is where the venom is accumulated. Exocrine glands are known in some species, which produce the venom compounds later used to inject into their victims. Examined workers of larger species have long and very potent stingers, with some stings measuring 6 millimetres (0.24 in).

== Relationship with humans ==
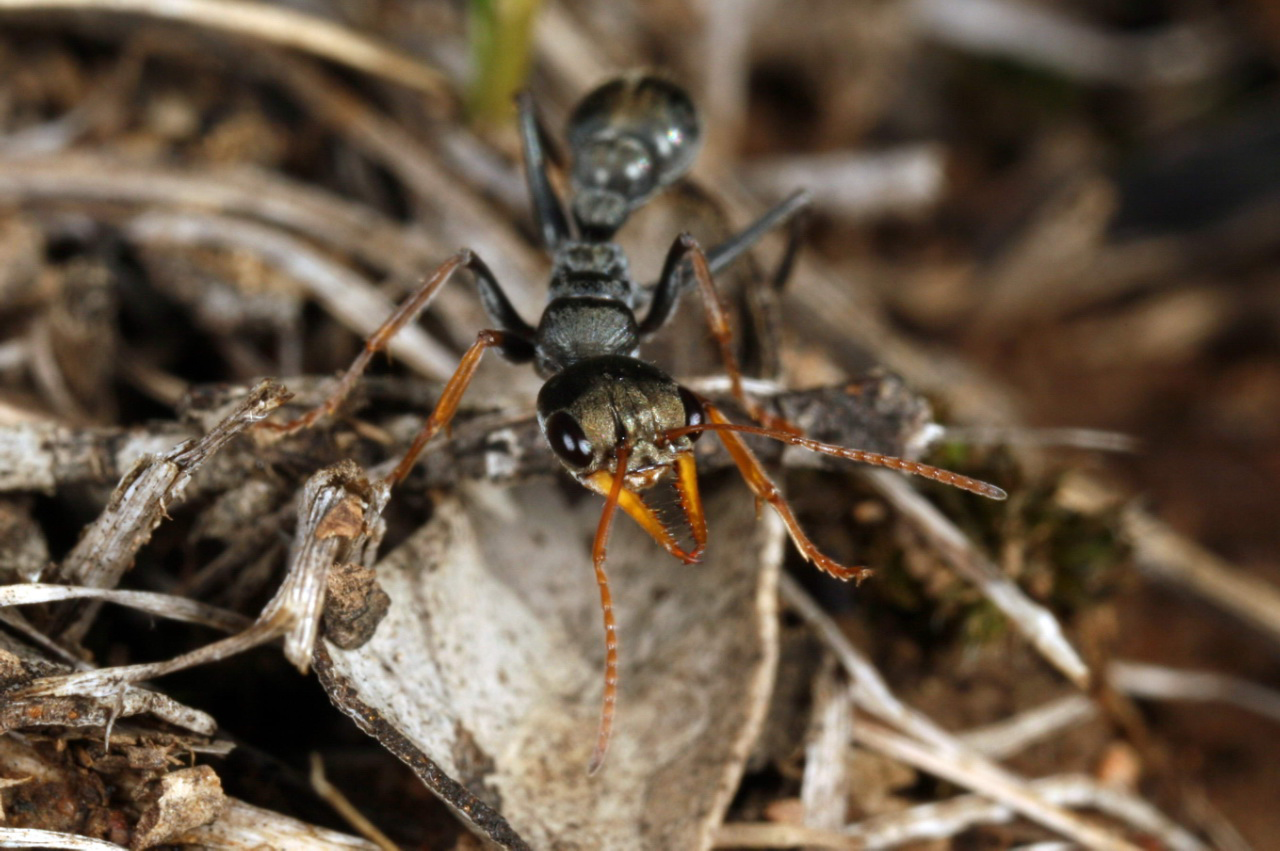
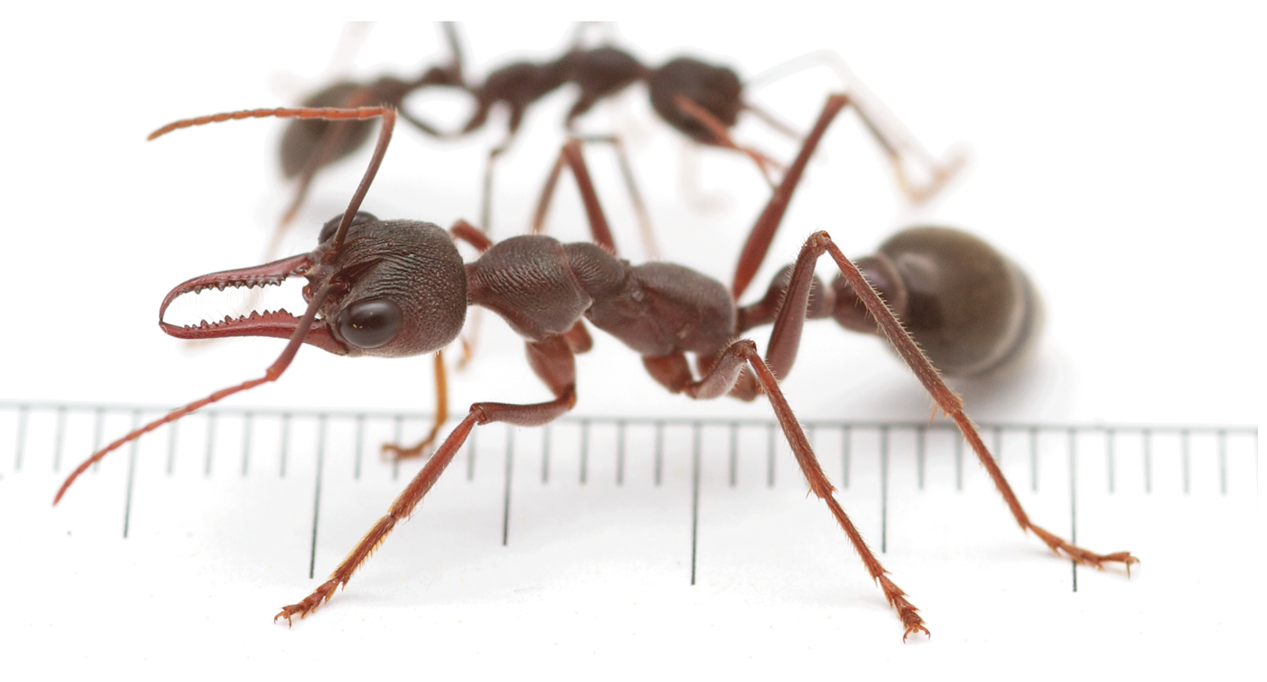
M. pilosula (left) and M. pyriformis (right)

Myrmecia is one of the best-known genera of ants. Myrmecia ants usually display defensive behaviour only around their nests, and are more timid while foraging. However, most species are extremely aggressive towards intruders; a few, such as M. tarsata, are timid, and the workers retreat into their nest instead of pursuing the intruder. If a nest is disturbed, a large force of workers rapidly swarms out of their nest to attack and kill the intruder. Some species, particularly those of the M. nigrocincta and M. pilosula species groups, are capable of jumping several inches when they are agitated after their nest has been disturbed; jumper ants propel their jumps by a sudden extension of their middle and hind legs. M. pyriformis is considered the most dangerous ant in the world by the Guinness World Records. M. inquilina is the only species of this genus that is considered vulnerable by the IUCN, although the conservation status needs updating.

Fatalities associated with Myrmecia stings are well known, and have been attested to by multiple sources. In 1931 two adults and an infant girl from New South Wales died from ant stings, possibly from M. pilosula or M. pyriformis. Another fatality was reported in 1963 in Tasmania. Between 1980 and 2000, there were six recorded deaths, five in Tasmania and one in New South Wales. Four of these deaths were due to M. pilosula, while the remaining two died from a M. pyriformis sting. Half of the victims had known ant-sting allergies, but only one of the victims was carrying adrenaline before being stung. Most victims died within 20 minutes of being stung, but one of the victims died in just five minutes from a M. pyriformis sting. No death has been officially recorded since 2003, but M. pilosula may have been responsible for the death of a man from Bunbury in 2011. Prior to the establishment of a desensitisation program, Myrmecia stings caused one fatality every four years.

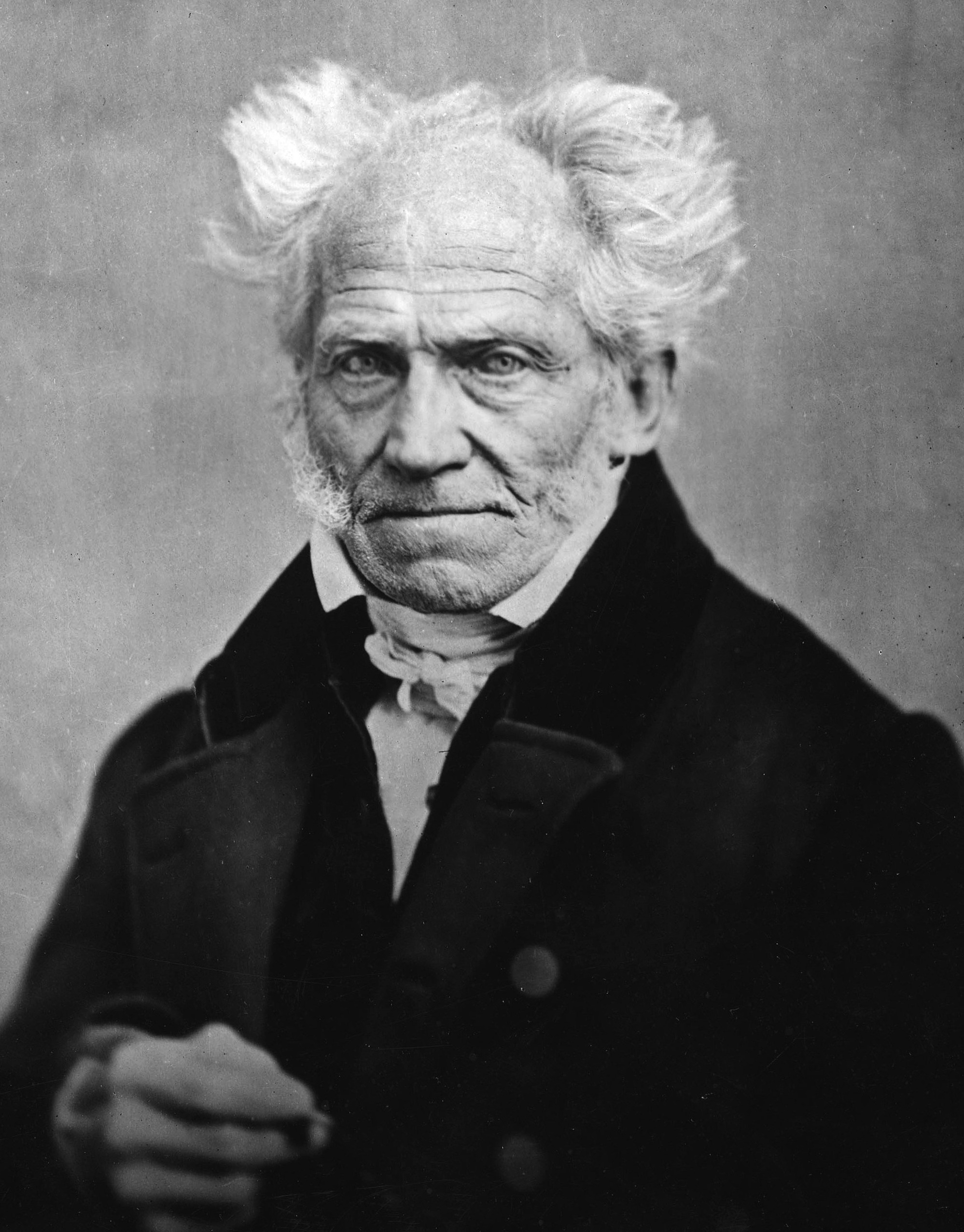
Schopenhauer mentioned Myrmecia in his work, The World as Will and Representation

Due to their large mandibles, Myrmecia ants have been used as surgical sutures to close wounds. The ant is featured on a postage stamp and on an uncirculated coin which are part of the Things That Sting issue by Australia Post, and M. gulosa is the emblem for the Australian Entomological Society. Myrmecia famously appears in the philosopher Arthur Schopenhauer's major work, The World as Will and Representation, as a paradigmatic example of strife and constant destruction endemic to the "will to live".

But the bulldog-ant of Australia affords us the most extraordinary example of this kind; for if it is cut in two, a battle begins between the head and the tail. The head seizes the tail in its teeth, and the tail defends itself bravely by stinging the head: the battle may last for half an hour, until they die or are dragged away by other ants. This contest takes place every time the experiment is tried."

Notable Australian poet Diane Fahey wrote a poem about Myrmecia, which is based on Schopenhauer's description, and a music piece written by German composer Karola Obermüller was named after the ant.

=== Venom ===
Each Myrmecia species has different venom components, so people who are allergic to ants are advised to stay away from Myrmecia, especially from species they have never encountered before. Based on five species, the median lethal dose (LD_{50}) is 0.18–0.35 mg/kg, making it among the most toxic venoms in the insect world. The toxicity of the venom may have evolved due to the intense predation by animals and birds during the day, since Myrmecia is primarily diurnal. In Tasmania, 2–3% of the human population is allergic to M. pilosula venom. In comparison, only 1.6% people are allergic to the venom of the western honeybee (Apis mellifera), and 0.6% to the venom of the European wasp (Vespula germanica). In a 2011 Australian ant-venom allergy study, the objective of which was to determine what native Australian ants were associated with ant sting anaphylaxis, 265 of the 376 participants in the study reacted to the sting of several Myrmecia species. Of these, the majority of patients (176) reacted to M. pilosula venom and to those of several other species. In Perth, M. gratiosa was responsible for most cases of anaphylaxis due to ant stings, while M nigriscapa and M. ludlowi were responsible for two cases. The green-head ant (Rhytidoponera metallica) was the only ant other than Myrmecia species to cause anaphylaxis in patients. Dogs are also at risk of death from Myrmecia ants; renal failure has been recorded in dogs experiencing mass envenomation, and one dog was euthanised due to its deteriorating health despite treatment. Sensitivity is persistent for many years. Pilosulin 3 has been identified as a major allergen in M. pilosula venom, while pilosulin 1 and pilosulin 4 are minor allergens.

=== Sting treatment and prevention ===
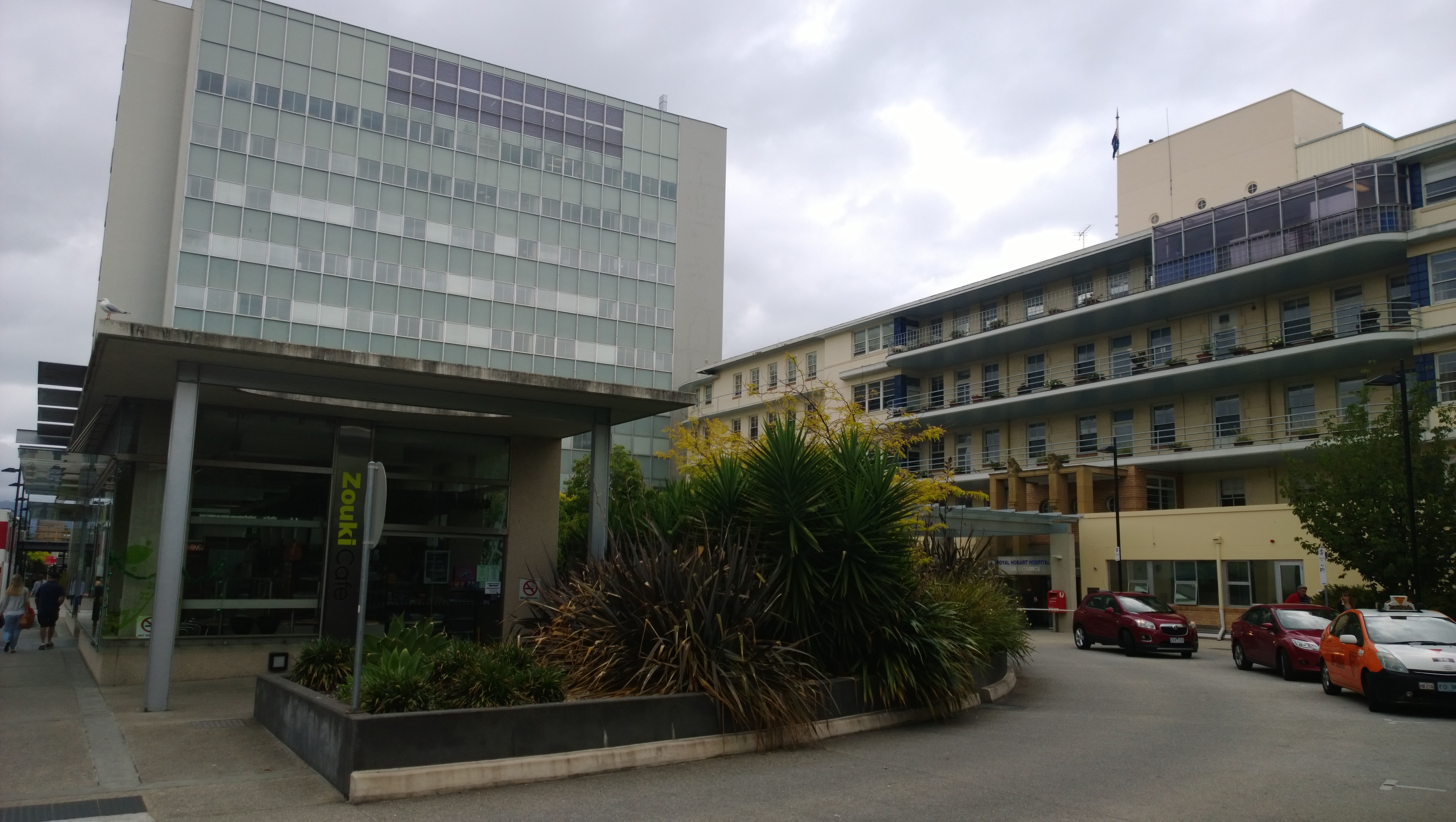
The Royal Hobart Hospital in Hobart, Tasmania offers a desensitisation program for people who are prone to severe anaphylactic reactions to M. pilosula stings.

The nature of treatment for a Myrmecia sting depends on the severity of stingose, and the use of antihistamine tablets are other methods to reduce the pain. Indigenous Australians use bush remedies to treat Myrmecia stings, such as rubbing the tips of bracken ferns onto the stung area. Carpobrotus glaucescens is also used to treat stung areas, using juices that are squeezed and rubbed onto the area, which quickly relieves the pain from the sting.

Emergency treatment is only needed if a person is showing signs of a severe allergic reaction. Prior to calling for help, stung persons should be laid down, and their legs elevated. An EpiPen or an Anapen is given to people at risk of anaphylaxis, to use in case they are stung. If someone experiences anaphylactic shock, adrenaline and intravenous infusions are required, and those who suffer cardiac arrest require resuscitation. Desensitisation (also called allergy immunotherapy) is offered to those who are susceptible to M. pilosula stings, and the program has shown effectiveness in preventing anaphylaxis. However, the standardisation of M. pilosula venom is not validated, and the program is poorly funded. The Royal Hobart Hospital and the Royal Adelaide Hospital are the only known hospitals to run desensitisation programs. During immunotherapy, patients are given an injection of venom under the skin. The first dose is small, but dosage gradually increases. This sort of immunotherapy is designed to change how the immune system reacts to increased doses of venom entering the body.

Before venom immunotherapy, whole-body extract immunotherapy was widely used due to its apparent effectiveness, and it was the only immunotherapy used for ant stings. However, fatal failures were reported, and this led to scientists to research for alternative methods of desensitisation. Before 1986 allergic reactions were not recorded and there was no study on Myrmecia sting venom; whole body extracts were later used on patients during the 1990s, but this was found to be ineffective and was subsequently withdrawn. In 2003, ant venom immunotherapy was shown to be safe and effective against Myrmecia venom.

Myrmecia ants are frequently encountered by humans, and avoiding them is difficult. They defend their nests aggressively, so visible nests should be avoided. Wearing closed footwear such as boots and shoes can reduce the risk of getting stung; these ants are capable of stinging through fabric, however. A risk of being stung while gardening also exists; most stings occur when someone is gardening and is unaware of the ants' presence. Eliminating nearby nests or moving to areas with low Myrmecia populations significantly decreases the chances of getting stung.

== See also ==
- List of ants of Australia
- Ant venom
