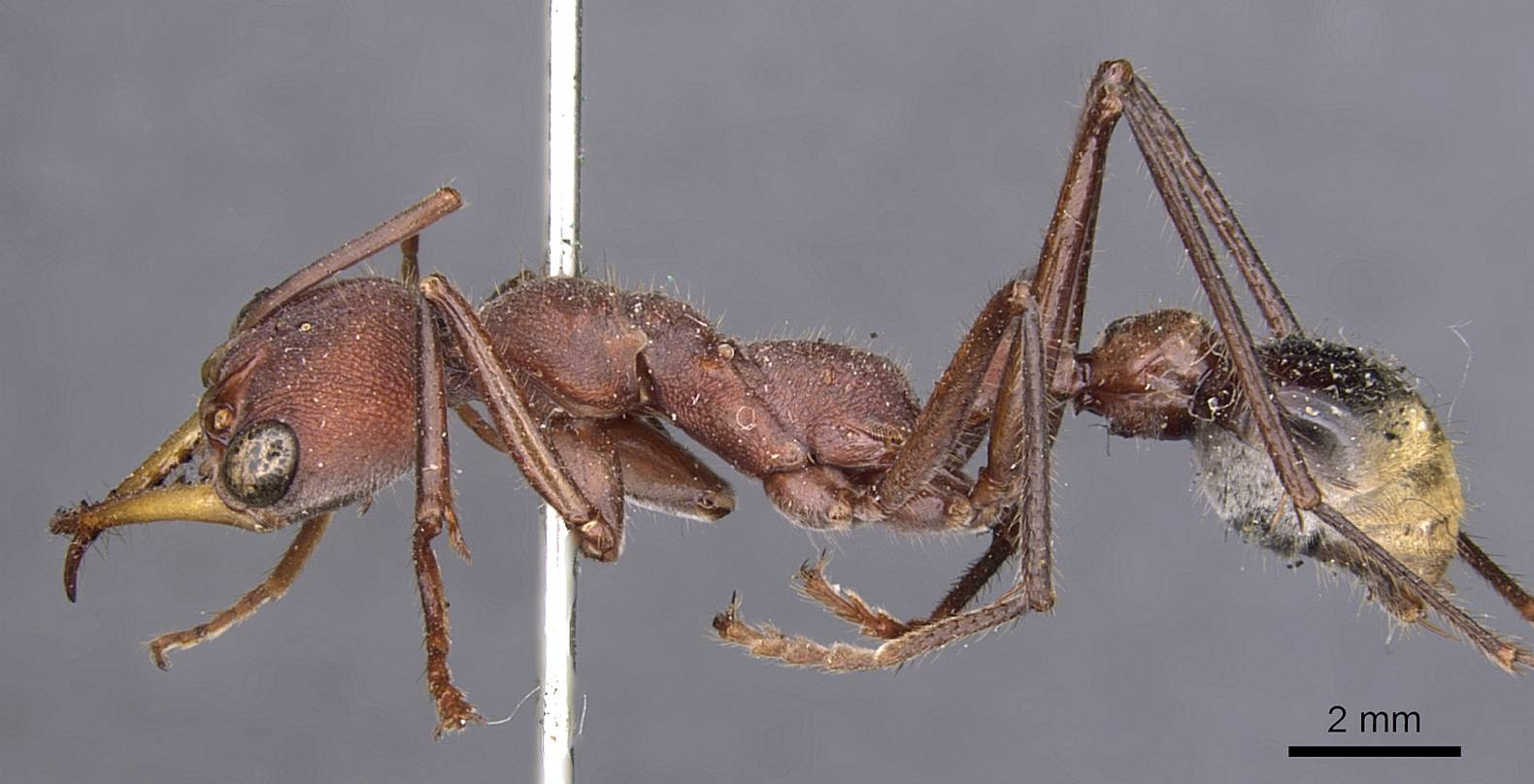

Scientific classification
- Kingdom: Animalia
- Phylum: Arthropoda
- Class: Insecta
- Order: Hymenoptera
- Family: Formicidae
- Subfamily: Myrmeciinae
- Genus: Myrmecia
- Species: M. minuscula

Binomial name
- Myrmecia minuscula Forel, 1915

= Myrmecia minuscula =

Species of ant

Myrmecia minuscula is an Australian ant which belongs to the genus Myrmecia. This species is native to Australia. They are distributed in the state of Queensland. They were described by Forel in 1915.

Myrmecia minuscula is a large bull ant. The mandibles are sort of bright yellow, and most of the body is a darkish-red colour. The thorax is a black colour and the legs are the same colour as most of its body.
