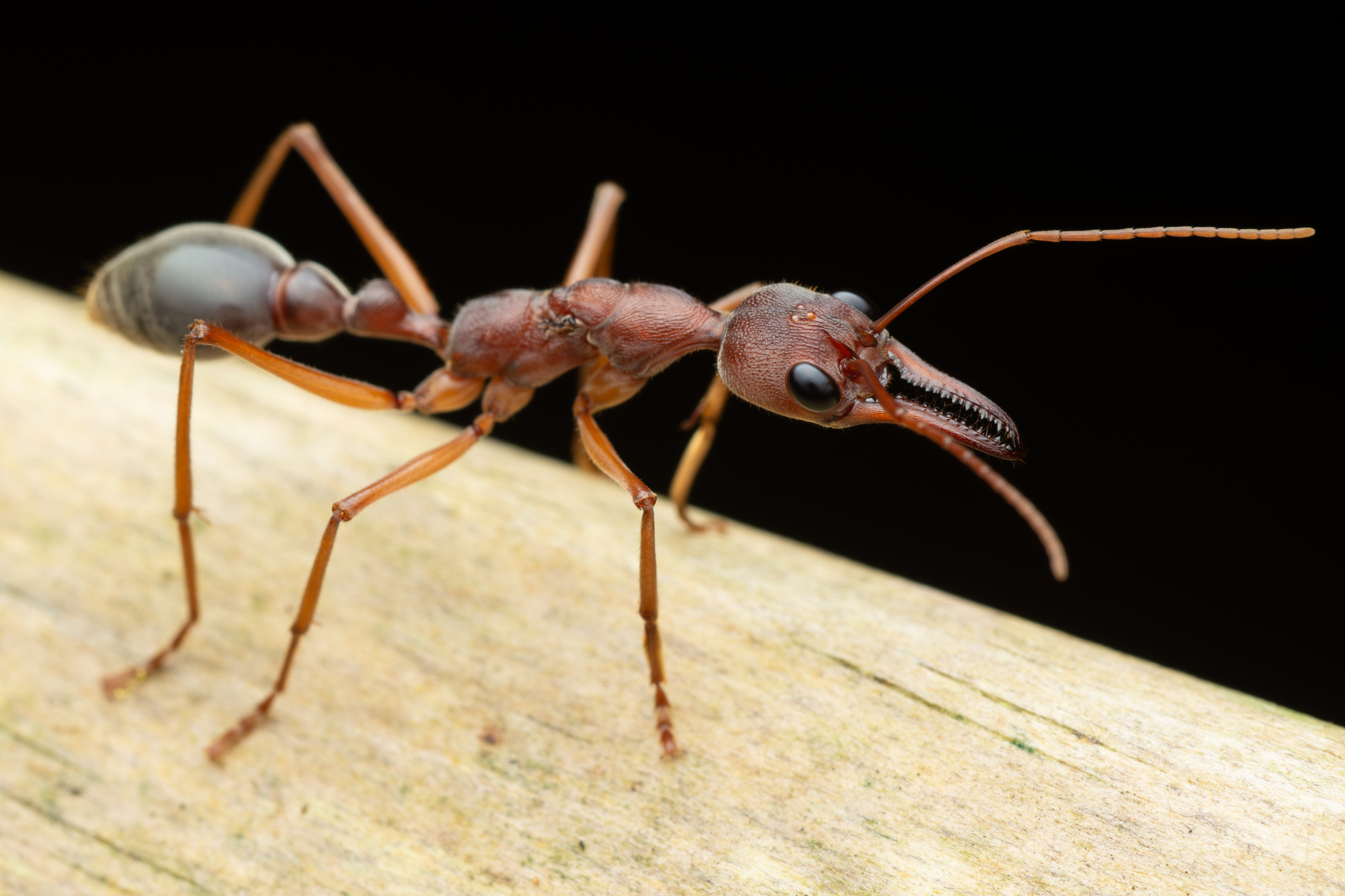
- Myrmecia mjobergi in Australia

Scientific classification
- Kingdom: Animalia
- Phylum: Arthropoda
- Clade: Pancrustacea
- Class: Insecta
- Order: Hymenoptera
- Family: Formicidae
- Subfamily: Myrmeciinae
- Genus: Myrmecia
- Species: M. mjobergi

Binomial name
- Myrmecia mjobergi Forel, 1915

= Myrmecia mjobergi =

Species of ant

Myrmecia mjobergi is an Australian ant which belongs to the genus Myrmecia. This species is native to Australia. They are heavily distributed in Queensland, and are also distributed in the several other states. They were described by Auguste-Henri Forel in 1915.

The lengths of an average worker can range from 17 to 27 millimetres (0.67 to 1.06 in). The queens can get to over 30 millimetres (1.2 in), while males are 20–24 millimetres (0.79–0.94 in) long. Their mandibles are much longer than most species. The head and thorax are red; a bit of the gaster is brownish red. The mandibles, legs and antennae can range from being red or being slightly yellowish-red.
