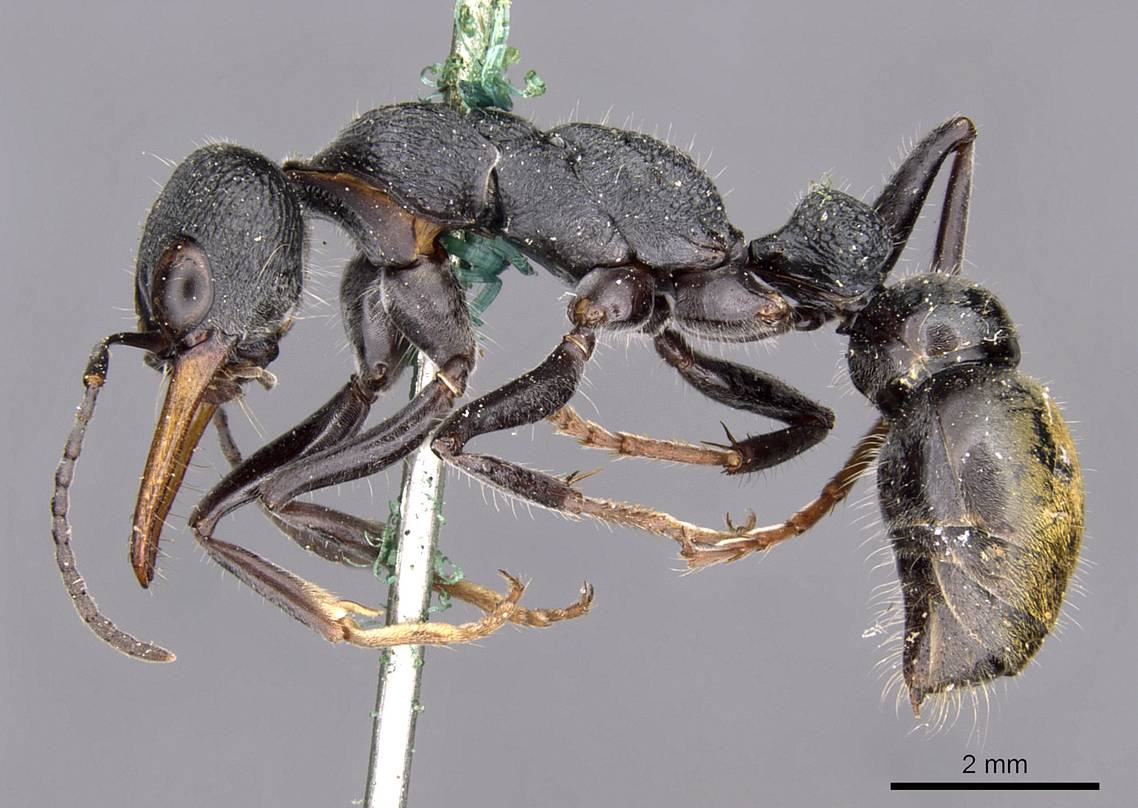

Scientific classification
- Kingdom: Animalia
- Phylum: Arthropoda
- Class: Insecta
- Order: Hymenoptera
- Family: Formicidae
- Subfamily: Myrmeciinae
- Genus: Myrmecia
- Species: M. luteiforceps

Binomial name
- Myrmecia luteiforceps Wheeler, 1933

= Myrmecia luteiforceps =

Species of ant

Myrmecia luteiforceps is an Australian ant which belongs to the genus Myrmecia. This species is native to Australia. Their distribution in Australia has not been observed much but have been noted in New South Wales and Queensland. They were described by Wheeler in 1933.

The known description for Myrmecia luteiforceps is a worker. They are typically on average around 12 millimetres long, making them a rather small species. They are mainly black, but the mandibles are yellow, antennae and legs brown, and the tarsi is reddish.
