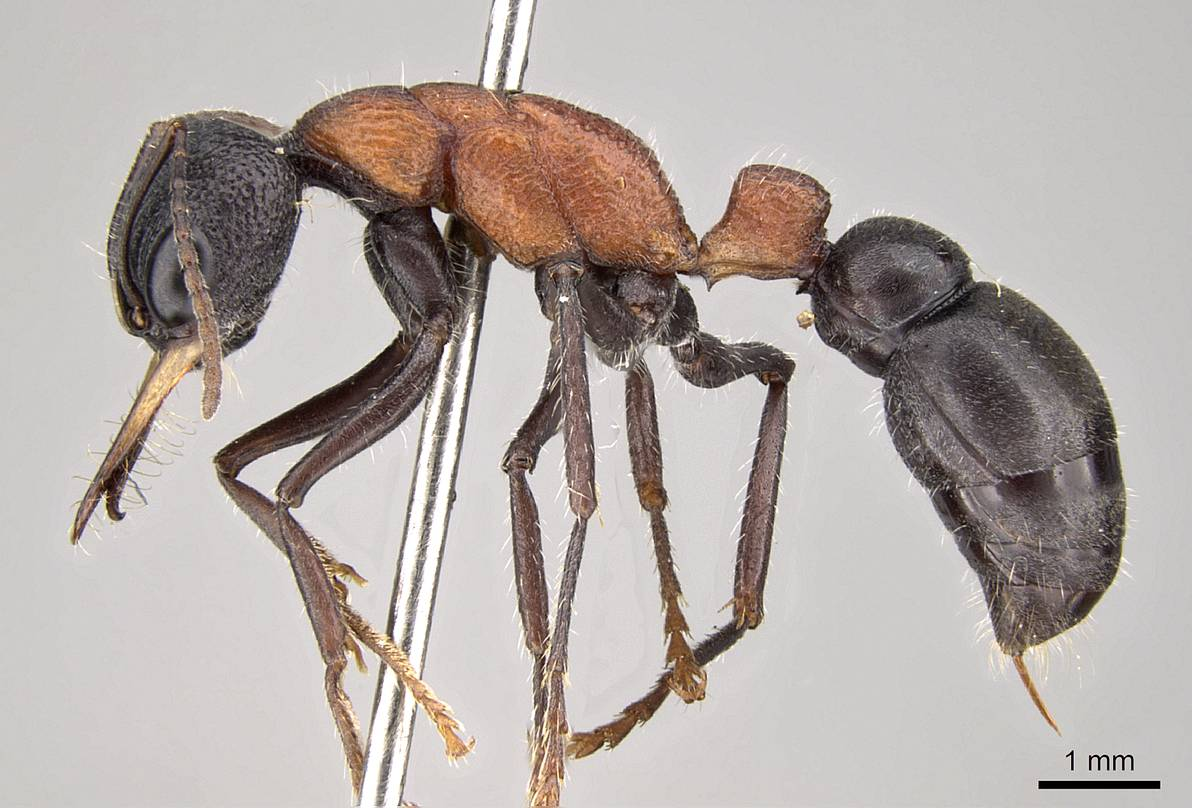

Scientific classification
- Kingdom: Animalia
- Phylum: Arthropoda
- Class: Insecta
- Order: Hymenoptera
- Family: Formicidae
- Subfamily: Myrmeciinae
- Genus: Myrmecia
- Species: M. swalei

Binomial name
- Myrmecia swalei Crawley, 1922

= Myrmecia swalei =

Species of ant

Myrmecia swalei is an Australian ant which belongs to the genus Myrmecia. This species is native to Australia and is commonly distributed in Western Australia and South Australia. It was described by Crawley in 1922.

Mandibles between the workers and queen are notable. The workers have larger mandibles while the queens are smaller. The average length for a worker is around 11–12.5 millimetres, and the queen is larger at 15–16.5 millimetres. The head, postpetiole and gaster are black, thorax and node is a bright red colour, and the mandibles are yellow. The antennae and legs are brown, but the scapes are more of a darker brown compared to the antennae and legs.
