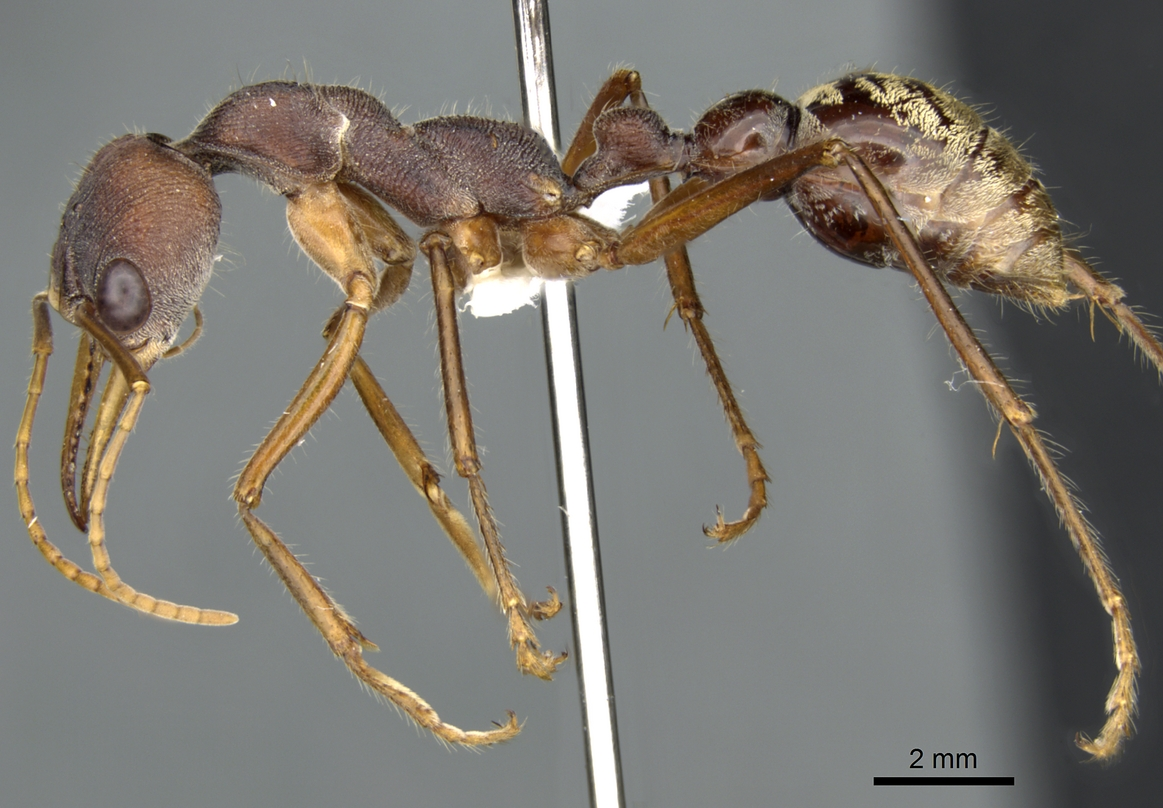

Scientific classification
- Kingdom: Animalia
- Phylum: Arthropoda
- Class: Insecta
- Order: Hymenoptera
- Family: Formicidae
- Subfamily: Myrmeciinae
- Genus: Myrmecia
- Species: M. eungellensis

Binomial name
- Myrmecia eungellensis Ogata & Taylor, 1991

= Myrmecia eungellensis =

Species of ant

Myrmecia eungellensis is an Australian bull ant species, a part of the genus Myrmecia. They are native to Australia. Myrmecia eungellensis is primarily seen only in Queensland.

Myrmecia eungellensis is mainly dark brown. The legs and antennae are of a lighter brown colour, and the thorax is a darker brown compared to the rest of the body and half golden yellow. The mandibles are the same colour as the legs and antennae.
