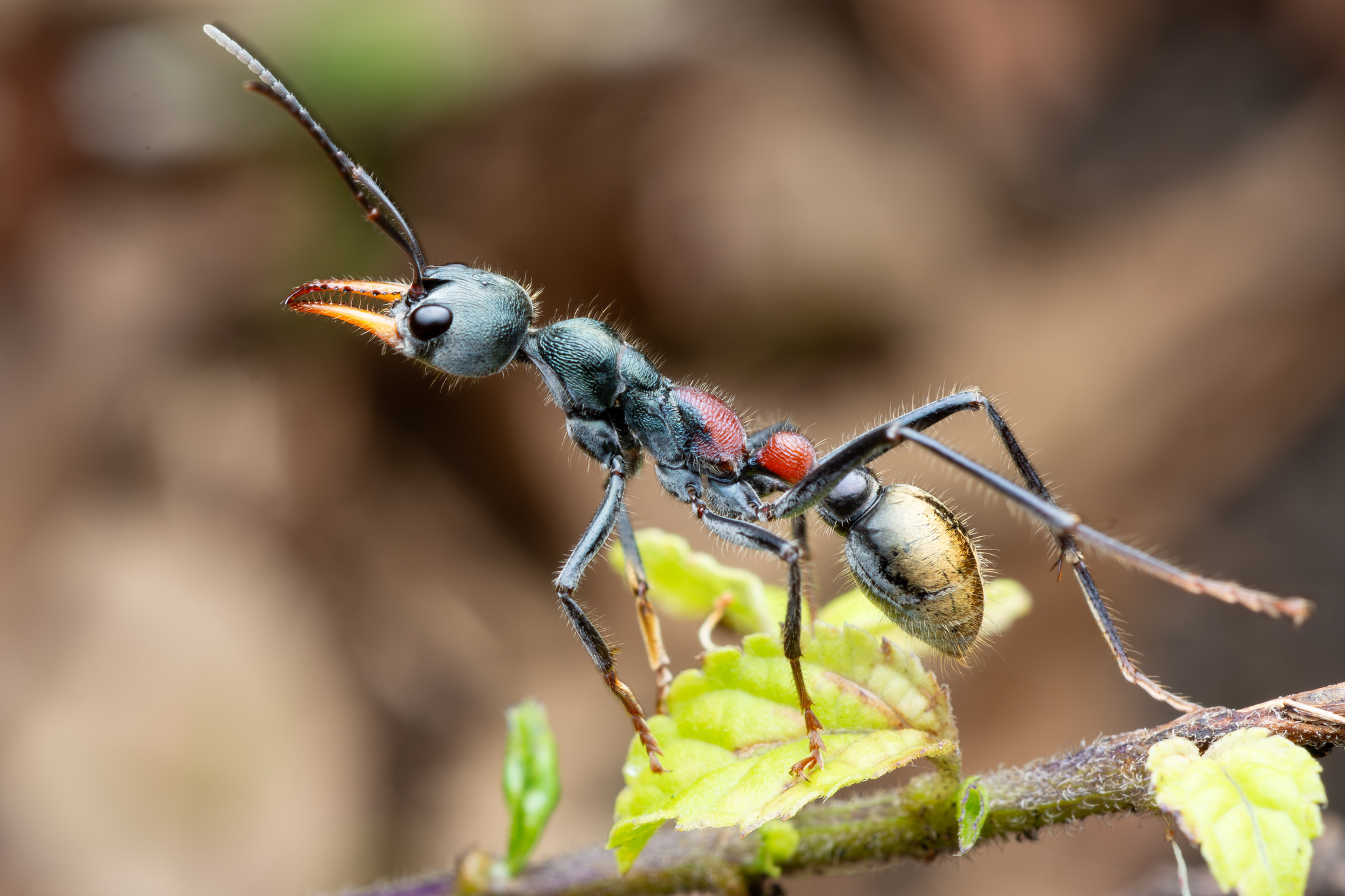
- Myrmecia athertonensis in Australia

Scientific classification
- Kingdom: Animalia
- Phylum: Arthropoda
- Clade: Pancrustacea
- Class: Insecta
- Order: Hymenoptera
- Family: Formicidae
- Subfamily: Myrmeciinae
- Genus: Myrmecia
- Species: M. athertonensis

Binomial name
- Myrmecia athertonensis Forel, 1915

= Myrmecia athertonensis =

Species of ant endemic to Australia

Myrmecia athertonensis is an Australian ant which belongs to the genus Myrmecia. This species is endemic to Australia. They are commonly spotted in the north of Queensland, between the coastal cities of Cairns and Townsville. It was described by Forel in 1915.

The average lengths is around 14.6-22 millimetres long, and the males are 14.5-15.5 millimetres long. The body is covered with sparse, very fine, long, yellowish hairs. Most of the body of the species is black. The mandibles are however yellow, and the thorax is in a goldish-yellow colour.
