= Myrmecia rubripes =

Scientific classification
- Kingdom: Animalia
- Phylum: Arthropoda
- Class: Insecta
- Order: Hymenoptera
- Family: Formicidae
- Subfamily: Myrmeciinae
- Genus: Myrmecia
- Species: M. rubripes

Binomial name
- Myrmecia rubripes Clark, 1951

Species of ant

Myrmecia rubripes is an Australian ant which belongs to the genus Myrmecia. This species is native to Australia. Their distribution is mainly in Western Australia.

Average lengths for a worker is 19-21 millimetres. The head and thorax is in a black colour; antennae, and other features are mainly red. The mandibles are a yellow colour.
