= Myrmecia potteri =

Scientific classification
- Kingdom: Animalia
- Phylum: Arthropoda
- Class: Insecta
- Order: Hymenoptera
- Family: Formicidae
- Subfamily: Myrmeciinae
- Genus: Myrmecia
- Species: M. potteri

Binomial name
- Myrmecia potteri Clark, 1951

Species of ant

Myrmecia potteri is an Australian ant which belongs to the genus Myrmecia. This species is native to Australia. Myrmecia potteri is reportedly distributed in the eastern states of Australia. Only two confirmed specimens exist.

The size for a worker Myrmecia potteri is around 12-13 millimetres long. It is primarily black. Mandibles, antennae, legs, and several other features are brown. The tarsi is a lighter and more yellowish-brown colour.
