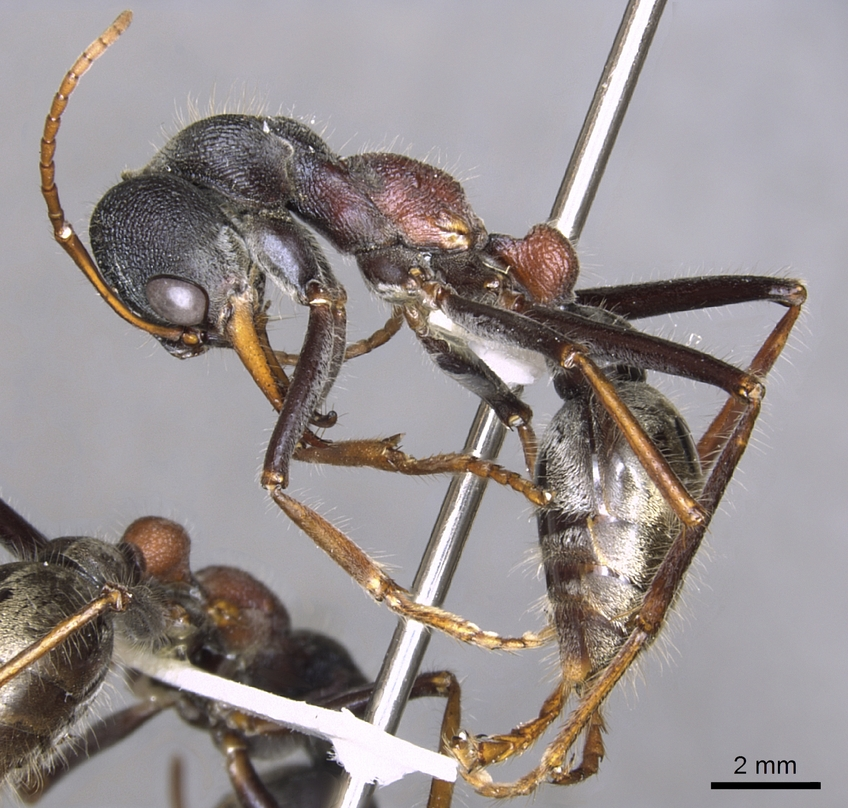

Scientific classification
- Kingdom: Animalia
- Phylum: Arthropoda
- Class: Insecta
- Order: Hymenoptera
- Family: Formicidae
- Subfamily: Myrmeciinae
- Genus: Myrmecia
- Species: M. borealis

Binomial name
- Myrmecia borealis Ogata & Taylor, 1991

= Myrmecia borealis =

Species of ant endemic to Australia

Myrmecia borealis is an Australian ant which belongs to the genus Myrmecia. This species is endemic to Australia. Their distribution has only been recorded very few times in Queensland and New South Wales.

The head and thorax of the Myrmecia borealis is black. The top of the legs are black as well, but the bottom areas are yellowish brown. Mandibles are yellow and the middle part of the body is a reddish-brown colour.
