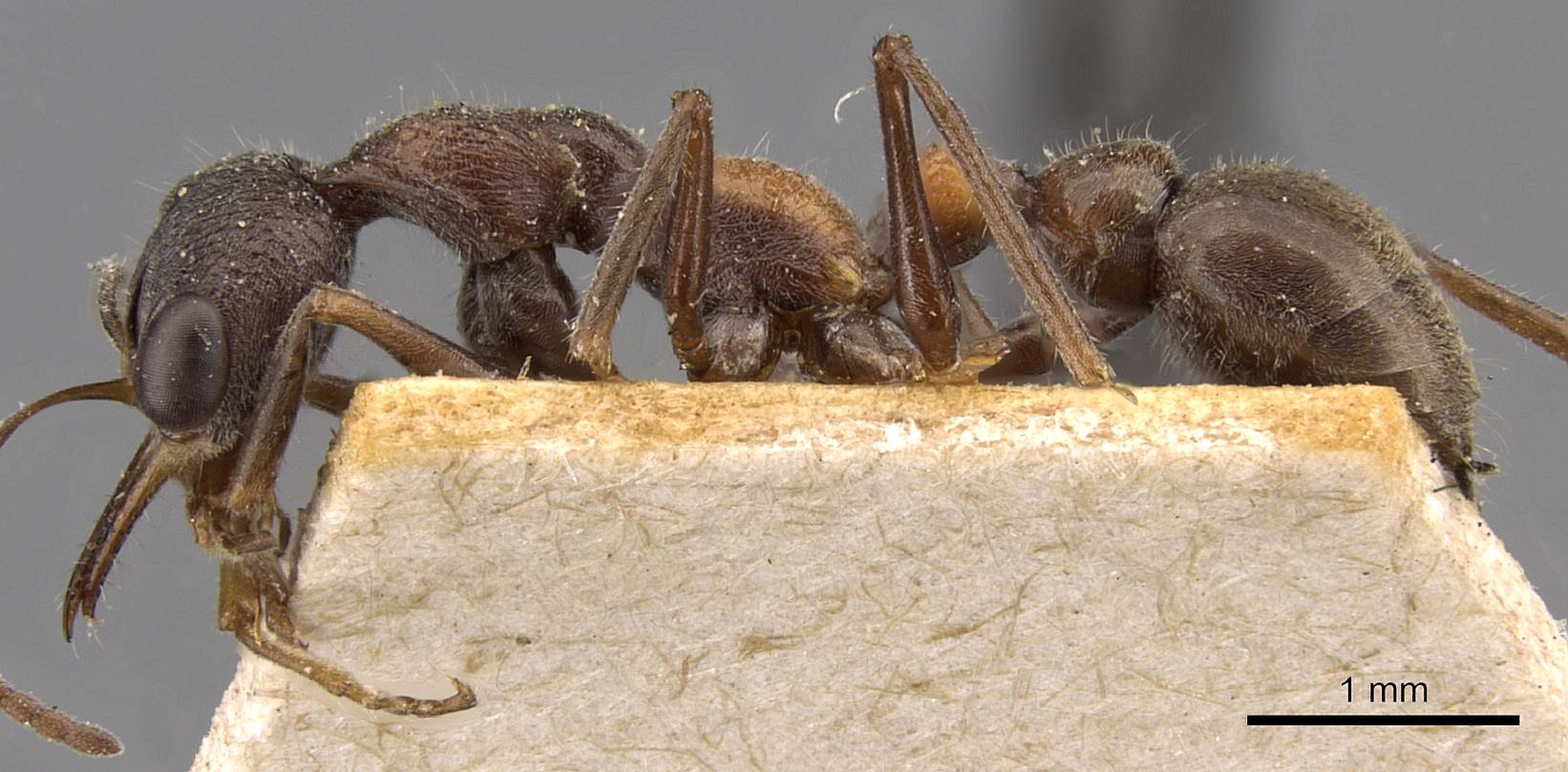

Scientific classification
- Kingdom: Animalia
- Phylum: Arthropoda
- Class: Insecta
- Order: Hymenoptera
- Family: Formicidae
- Subfamily: Myrmeciinae
- Genus: Myrmecia
- Species: M. infima

Binomial name
- Myrmecia infima Forel, 1900

= Myrmecia infima =

Species of ant

Myrmecia infima is an Australian ant species of the genus Myrmecia. First described in 1900 by Auguste-Henri Forel, Myrmecia infima are frequently seen in the western regions of Australia.

Myrmecia infima are rather small bull ants. The average length of a worker is around 6–8 millimetres (which is small when compared to other Myrmecia species that grow over 40 millimetres). Males tend to be 7–8 millimetres long.
