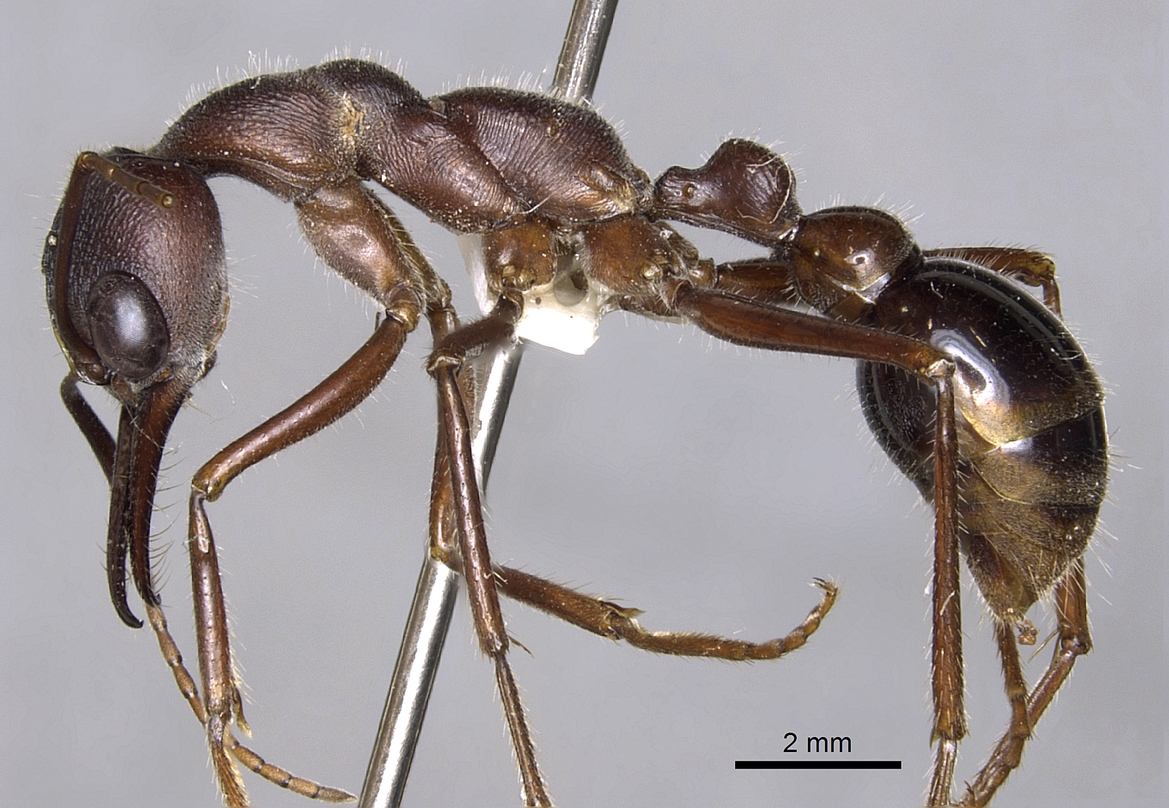

Scientific classification
- Kingdom: Animalia
- Phylum: Arthropoda
- Class: Insecta
- Order: Hymenoptera
- Family: Formicidae
- Subfamily: Myrmeciinae
- Genus: Myrmecia
- Species: M. browningi

Binomial name
- Myrmecia browningi Ogata & Taylor, 1991

= Myrmecia browningi =

Species of ant endemic to Australia

Myrmecia browningi is an Australian bull ant species, a part of the genus Myrmecia. They are endemic to Kangaroo Island within the state of South Australia, Australia.

The species was first described by Ogata & Taylor in 1991, named after Graeme P. Browning.
