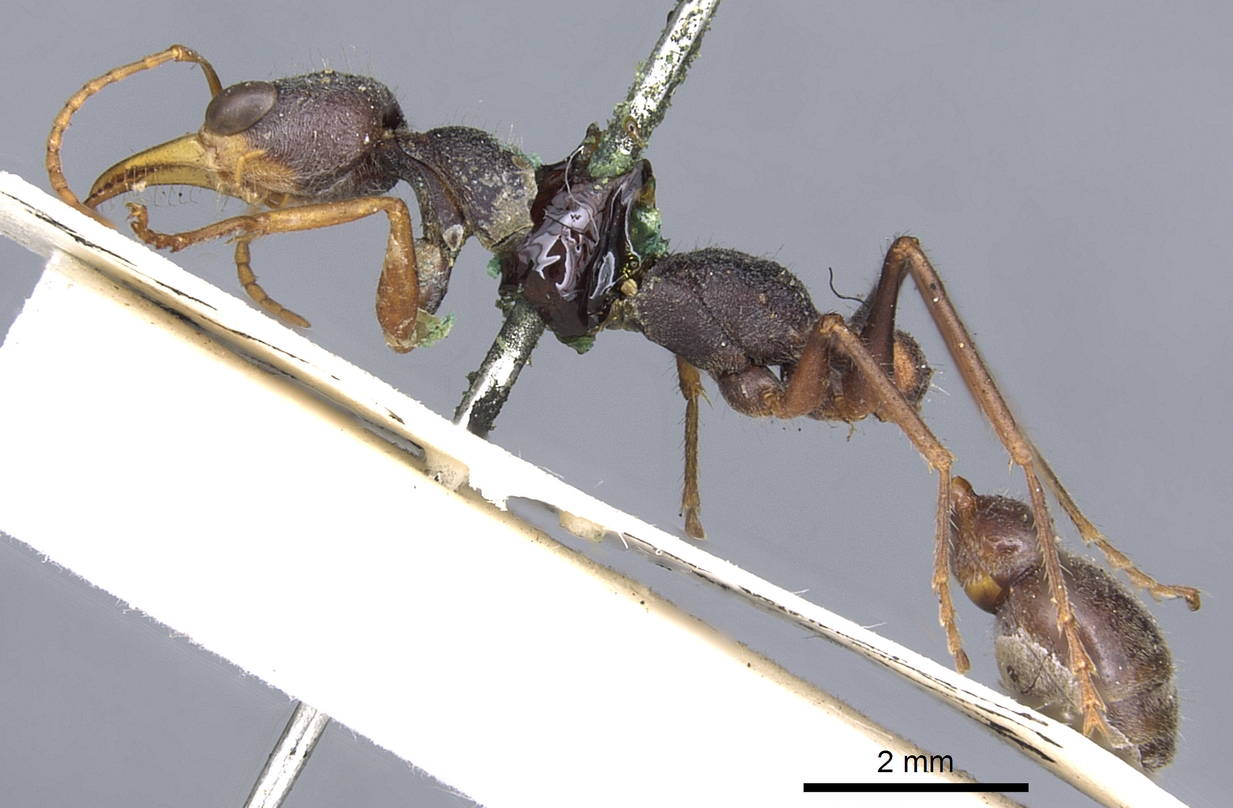
- Myrmecia picta worker

Scientific classification
- Kingdom: Animalia
- Phylum: Arthropoda
- Class: Insecta
- Order: Hymenoptera
- Family: Formicidae
- Subfamily: Myrmeciinae
- Genus: Myrmecia
- Species: M. picta

Binomial name
- Myrmecia picta Smith, 1858

= Myrmecia picta =

Species of ant

Myrmecia picta is an Australian ant which belongs to the genus Myrmecia. It is native to Australia. Myrmecia picta is distributed throughout all of Australia.

The length of Myrmecia picta is around 13.5-14.5 millimetres long. Most of the body is in a black colour, mandibles are yellow; antennae and anterior legs are a reddish yellow. Colour of nodes range in colour, being brown or a reddish colour.
