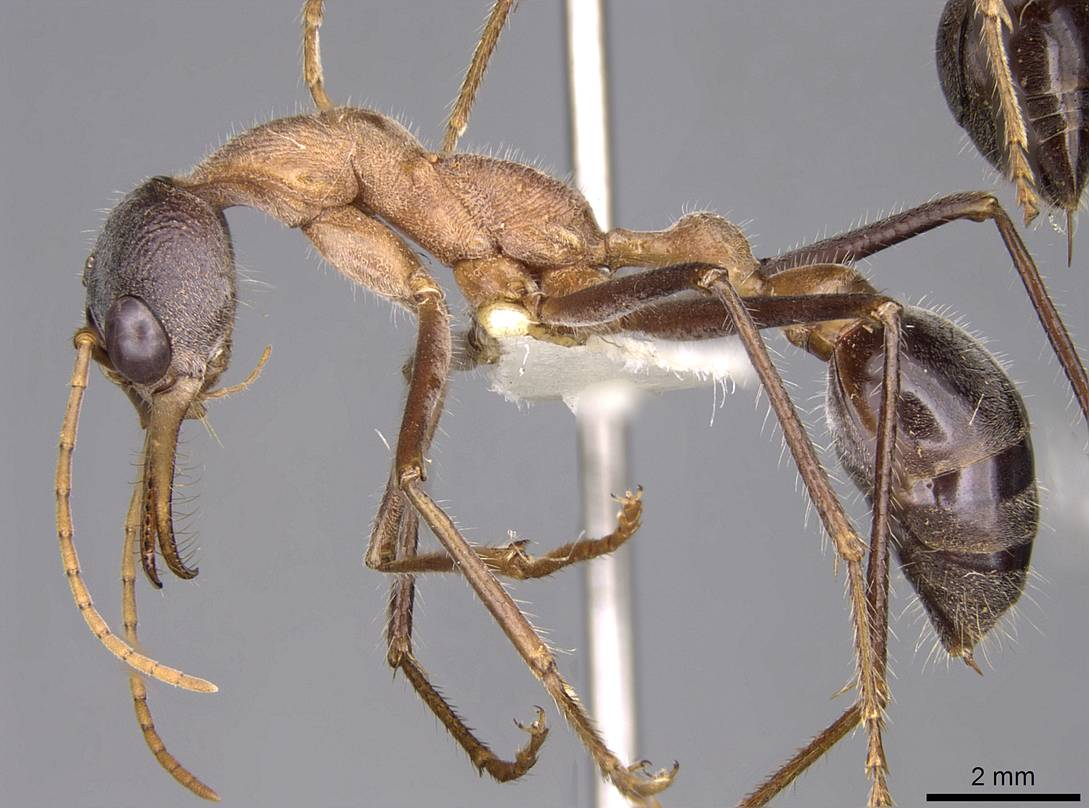
- Myrmecia fuscipes worker

Scientific classification
- Kingdom: Animalia
- Phylum: Arthropoda
- Class: Insecta
- Order: Hymenoptera
- Family: Formicidae
- Subfamily: Myrmeciinae
- Genus: Myrmecia
- Species: M. fuscipes

Binomial name
- Myrmecia fuscipes Clark, 1951

= Myrmecia fuscipes =

Species of ant

Myrmecia fuscipes is an Australian ant which belongs to the genus Myrmecia. This species is native to Australia. Their distribution is heavily observed in South Australia and Western Australia.

The average size of a worker ant is 20-21 millimetres in length. The head and gaster are black, the antennae, thorax, node, and other features are a yellowish-red colour. Mandibles are yellow, and the anterior legs are light brown, and the middle and posterior pair is dark brown. It can also range to an almost black like colour in some cases.
