= List of Myrmecia species =

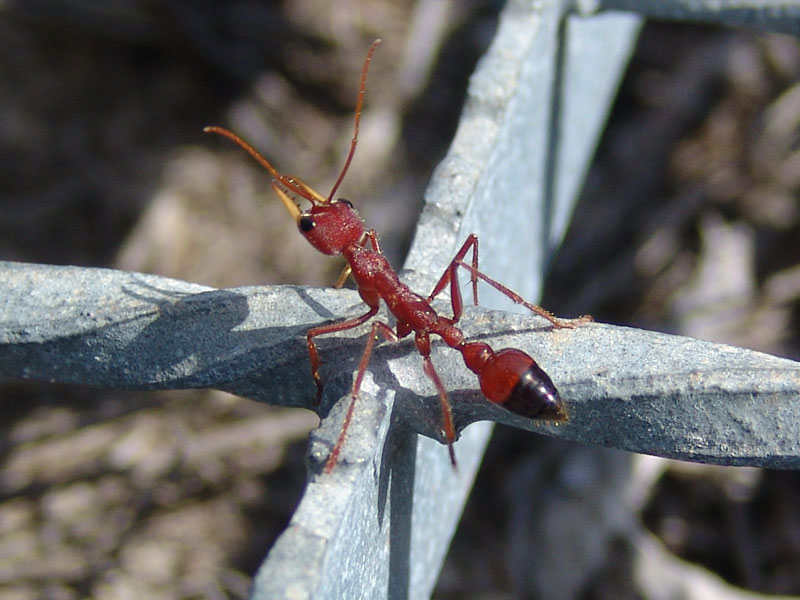
M. gulosa was designated as the type species of Myrmecia in 1840.

Myrmecia is a genus of small to large venomous ants commonly known as bulldog ants or jack jumper ants. The genus was first established by Danish zoologist Johan Christian Fabricius in 1804 and is placed in the subfamily Myrmeciinae of the family Formicidae. There are currently 94 described species in this genus, 93 of which are valid and identifiable. Almost all species are endemic to Australia and can be found nowhere else, with an exception of a single species found in New Caledonia.

== Species ==
Species name	Image	Authority	Year	Description
Myrmecia aberrans		Forel	1900	Specimens of this species are only known from workers collected in South Australia. The average length is around 12 millimetres (0.47 in), with reddish-yellow mandibles, clypeus and antennae. Its head, mesonotum and parts of its thorax, postpetiole and gaster are black. In contrast to other species, the mandibles are noticeably short.
Myrmecia acuta		Ogata & Taylor	1991	Relatively small species that is found in Western Australia. It has a close resemblance to M. swalei, but it can be distinguished by its higher density of pilosity, its pointed labral process and its more inflated mesosoma. Its body is bicoloured, but most of it is dark brown or black. The mesosoma and postpetiole are reddish brown, and its mandibles are yellow. The mandibles are longer than the head.
Myrmecia analis		Mayr	1862	M. analis is a large species that is found in Western Australia and some of the eastern states, based on collected workers and queens. Males are unknown. Workers measure 18 to 20 millimetres (0.71 to 0.79 in) and dealated queens 20 to 22 millimetres (0.79 to 0.87 in). The head, node, postpetiole and thorax is coloured red, and the mandibles and legs are reddish yellow. The scapes and gaster are brown and black respectively.
Myrmecia apicalis		Emery	1883	
Myrmecia arnoldi		Clark	1951	M. arnoldi is only known from workers collected in Western Australia. It is a large species, measuring 18 to 20 millimetres (0.71 to 0.79 in) with a black head and gaster, a brown femora, node, postpetiole and thorax, and yellow mandibles. The antennae, mandibles, tarsi and tibiae are yellow or reddish yellow.
Myrmecia athertonensis		Forel	1915	
Myrmecia auriventris		Mayr	1870	M. auriventris is only known from colonies observed in Queensland. Workers vary in length, measuring 18 to 20 millimetres (0.71 to 0.79 in). The males measure 15.5 millimetres (0.61 in) and queens are unknown. The colour and pilosity between males and workers are similar, but the two castes can be distinguished from the workers by the size of the mandibles and its finer body sculpture. The gaster, head, mesonotum, postpetiole and pronotum are black. The metanotum, epinotum and node is red, and the antennae, coxae, mandibles and parts of the femora and tarsi are reddish yellow.
Myrmecia banksi	—N/a	Taylor	2015	
Myrmecia borealis		Ogata & Taylor	1991	
Myrmecia brevinoda		Forel	1910	M. brevinoda is a giant Myrmecia species that is known from New South Wales, Queensland and Victoria. It is also the only known species that was introduced outside its natural geographical range, with colonies found in New Zealand. (Note: The last known recorded occurrence of M. brevinoda in New Zealand was in 1981.) M. brevinoda may exhibit polymorphism among workers; workers of this species are among the largest ants in the world, measuring 13 to 37 millimetres (0.51 to 1.46 in). The queens measure 27 to 31 millimetres (1.06 to 1.22 in) and males are 20 to 22 millimetres (0.79 to 0.87 in) long. The ant is yellowish red, with the antennae, legs and mandibles lighter yellowish. The gaster is black. It resembles M. forficata in size and colour, but the two species can be distinguished by the form of the node.
Myrmecia browningi		Ogata & Taylor	1991	
Myrmecia callima	—N/a	Clark	1943	
Myrmecia cephalotes		Clark	1943	
Myrmecia chasei		Forel	1894	
Myrmecia chrysogaster		Clark	1943	
Myrmecia clarki		Crawley	1922	
Myrmecia comata		Clark	1951	M. comata is only known from workers and larvae collected in Queensland and New South Wales. This species is similar to M. flavicoma, but can be distinguished by its colour and shape of the mandible teeth and node. Workers measure 18 to 20 millimetres (0.71 to 0.79 in) in length. The colour of the head, node, postpetiole and thorax is reddish brown, the gaster is black, and antennae, legs and mandibles are yellowish brown.
Myrmecia croslandi	—N/a	Taylor	1991	
Myrmecia cydista		Clark	1943	
Myrmecia desertorum		Wheeler	1915	M. desertorum is only known from workers and queens that are found throughout Australia. Workers measure 18 to 27.5 millimetres (0.71 to 1.08 in) and queens are 24 to 25 millimetres (0.94 to 0.98 in). The ant is reddish yellow, but the head and gaster is blackish brown. The clypeus, labrum and mandibles are yellow. The queens can be distinguished from the workers by its coarser body and the long, abundant pilosity.
Myrmecia dichospila		Clark	1938	
Myrmecia dimidiata	—N/a	Clark	1951	Specimens are only known from workers collected in Queensland. Workers measure 23 to 25 millimetres (0.91 to 0.98 in) in length. The body is brownish red, with lighter antennae and legs. The mandibles are yellow, and part of the gaster is brown.
Myrmecia dispar	—N/a	Clark	1951	
Myrmecia elegans		Clark	1943	
Myrmecia erecta		Ogata & Taylor	1991	
Myrmecia esuriens		Fabricius	1804	Colonies are restricted to Tasmania, with all castes known. The workers measure 14 to 18 millimetres (0.55 to 0.71 in), the queens are 22 to 24 millimetres (0.87 to 0.94 in) and males are 16 millimetres (0.63 in). Most of the body is black, and the antennae, parts of the gaster, labrum legs, mandibles and postpetiole are ferruginous. Queens are ergatoids.
Myrmecia eungellensis		Ogata & Taylor	1991	
Myrmecia exigua		Clark	1943	
Myrmecia fabricii		Ogata & Taylor	1991	
Myrmecia ferruginea	—N/a	Mayr	1876	
Myrmecia flammicollis	—N/a	Brown	1953	M. flammicollis is only known from workers collected in Far North Queensland. Workers are medium in size, measuring about 13 millimetres (0.51 in), with a generally black body. The prothorax is orange-red, and the mandibles, antennal scapes and legs are reddish brown. The palpi, and parts of the antennae, mandibles and tarsi are yellow. This species is similar to Myrmecia petiolata, but is more slender and differs in colouration.
Myrmecia flavicoma		Roger	1861	Specimens of this species are only known from workers collected in Queensland. The workers are large, measuring 21 to 22 millimetres (0.83 to 0.87 in). The head, node, thorax and postpetiole are red, the mandibles are yellow, and the antennae, clypeus and legs are reddish yellow. The gaster is black.
Myrmecia forceps		Roger	1861	M. forceps colonies are found throughout New South Wales and Queensland. Workers measure 19 to 24 millimetres (0.75 to 0.94 in) and dealated queens 25 millimetres (0.98 in). Males are unknown. The worker caste and queens are similar in appearance, but queens are larger and more darker. The head, node and postpetiole are red, and the antennae, clypeus, mandibles and legs yellow or reddish yellow. The gaster is black.
Myrmecia forficata		Fabricius	1787	
Myrmecia formosa	—N/a	Wheeler	1933	
Myrmecia froggatti		Forel	1910	
Myrmecia fucosa	—N/a	Clark	1934	
Myrmecia fulgida	—N/a	Clark	1951	Workers are only known about this species, collected from colonies in Western Australia. Workers measure 24 to 26 millimetres (0.94 to 1.02 in) with a brownish-red head, node, postpetiole and thorax. The antennae and legs are lighter, the gaster is black and the mandibles are yellow.
Myrmecia fulviculis		Forel	1913	
Myrmecia fulvipes		Roger	1861	
Myrmecia fuscipes		Clark	1951	Specimens are only known from workers collected in South Australia, Victoria and Western Australia. Workers measure 20 to 21 millimetres (0.79 to 0.83 in) with a red head, node, postpetiole and thorax. The mandibles are yellow but get darker around the apex and the antennae and legs are reddish yellow. The gaster is black.
Myrmecia gilberti		Forel	1910	
Myrmecia gratiosa		Clark	1951	Specimens of this species are only known from workers collected in Western Australia. Collected workers measure 21 to 23 millimetres (0.83 to 0.91 in), and the antennae, head, legs, node, postpetiole and thorax are reddish yellow, and the labrum, tarsi, tibiae are lighter. The mandibles are pale yellow and the gaster is black. They are similar to M. vindex, but M. gratiosa is brightly coloured and the node is longer and slender.
Myrmecia gulosa		Fabricius	1775	M. gulosa is found throughout the eastern states and territories of Australia. It is a large species, with workers measuring 14 to 26 millimetres (0.55 to 1.02 in). The queens are the largest at 27 to 29 millimetres (1.06 to 1.14 in) and males 17 to 21 millimetres (0.67 to 0.83 in). The colour of the queen is similar to that of a worker, but can be distinguished by its larger size and abundant pilosity. Most of the body is yellowish red, but the posterior margin of the first segment of the gaster is black. All of the apical segments are also black. Unlike the males, whose mandibles are short, the mandibles of the worker and queen are almost as long as the head.
Myrmecia harderi		Forel	1910	
Myrmecia haskinsorum	—N/a	Taylor	2015	
Myrmecia hilli		Clark	1943	
Myrmecia hirsuta	—N/a	Clark	1951	
Myrmecia imaii	—N/a	Taylor	2015	
Myrmecia impaternata	—N/a	Taylor	2015	
Myrmecia infima		Forel	1900	
Myrmecia inquilina	—N/a	Douglas & Brown	1959	
Myrmecia loweryi		Ogata & Taylor	1991	
Myrmecia ludlowi		Crawley	1922	
Myrmecia luteiforceps		Wheeler	1933	
Myrmecia mandibularis		Smith	1858	
Myrmecia maura	—N/a	Wheeler	1933	
Myrmecia maxima	—N/a	Moore	1842	No type specimen is available. However, the description Moore provided undoubtedly describes a large Myrmecia species. He describes it as being "nearly an inch and a half long, having very sharp mandibles and a formidable sting, which produces very acute pain."
Myrmecia michaelseni		Forel	1907	
Myrmecia midas	—N/a	Clark	1951	Specimens of M. midas are only known from workers and queens from New South Wales and Queensland. The workers are 13 to 15 millimetres (0.51 to 0.59 in) and the queens measure 18 to 19 millimetres (0.71 to 0.75 in). Workers and queens exhibit similar colours and pilosity, but the body of the queen is coarser. Most of the body including the head, node, postpetiole and thorax is red and the gaster is black. The antennae, mandibles and legs are brownish red.
Myrmecia minuscula		Forel	1915	
Myrmecia mjobergi		Forel	1915	
Myrmecia nigra	—N/a	Forel	1907	
Myrmecia nigriceps		Mayr	1862	Colonies are known in the Australian Capital Territory, New South Wales, South Australia, Victoria and Western Australia. Workers measure 19 to 23 millimetres (0.75 to 0.91 in) and dealated queens are 23 to 26 millimetres (0.91 to 1.02 in). The males are smaller, measuring 18 to 20 millimetres (0.71 to 0.79 in). The head and gaster are black, and the thorax, node, and postpetiole are either red or yellowish red. The antennae, clypeus, legs and mandibles are yellow or testaceous.
Myrmecia nigriscapa		Roger	1861	Colonies of M. nigriscapa are found nationwide, with the exception of the Australian Capital Territory, Northern Territory and Tasmania. Workers measure 17 to 25 millimetres (0.67 to 0.98 in) and dealated queens are 23 to 26 millimetres (0.91 to 1.02 in). The males are smaller, measuring 16 to 20 millimetres (0.63 to 0.79 in). The head, node and thorax is red, and the legs, postpetiole and parts of the gaster are yellowish red. Most of the gaster and scapes are black, and the mandibles and clypeus are reddish yellow.
Myrmecia nigrocincta		Smith	1858	
Myrmecia nobilis		Clark	1943	
Myrmecia occidentalis		Clark	1943	
Myrmecia pavida	—N/a	Clark	1951	M. pavida is a large species that is only known from workers collected in Western Australia. Workers measure 19 to 22 millimetres (0.75 to 0.87 in), with a black head and gaster. The node, postpetiole and thorax are brown, and the antennae and tarsi is red. The clypeus and mandibles are yellow.
Myrmecia petiolata		Emery	1895	
Myrmecia picta		Smith	1858	
Myrmecia picticeps	—N/a	Clark	1951	M. picticeps is only known from workers collected in Western Australia. On average, workers measure 18 to 19 millimetres (0.71 to 0.75 in). The frontal carinae, head, node, postpetiole thorax is red and the gaster is black. The antennae, legs and mandibles are either yellow or yellowish red.
Myrmecia piliventris		Smith	1858	
Myrmecia pilosula		Smith	1858	
Myrmecia potteri	—N/a	Clark	1951	
Myrmecia pulchra		Clark	1929	M. pulchra is only known from workers and queens collected in Victoria. It is a large species, with workers measuring 18 to 20 millimetres (0.71 to 0.79 in) and the queens are 20 to 22 millimetres (0.79 to 0.87 in). The head and gaster is black, and the node, postpetiole and thorax is red. The antennae, clypeus, mandibles, parts of its legs and tarsi are testaceous, and the coxae, femora and tibiae are brown.
Myrmecia pyriformis		Smith	1858	
Myrmecia queenslandica	—N/a	Forel	1915	
Myrmecia regularis		Crawley	1925	
Myrmecia rowlandi		Forel	1910	M. rowlandi is only known from workers collected in North Queensland. Workers range from 13 to 21 millimetres (0.51 to 0.83 in), with a black gaster, head, node, postpetiole and thorax. The legs are brownish black, its tarsi is reddish brown and the mandibles are yellowish red. The antennae are red. The notable morphological differences in the antennae, head, mandibles and node prevents M. rowlandi to be considered a subspecies of M. tarsata.
Myrmecia rubicunda		Clark	1943	
Myrmecia rubripes	—N/a	Clark	1951	Collected specimens are only known from workers in Western Australia. Workers range from 19 to 21 millimetres (0.75 to 0.83 in) with a black femora, gaster, head and postpetiole. The antennae, tarsi and parts of the tibiae are red, and the mandibles are yellow. The mandibles are slightly longer than the head.
Myrmecia rufinodis		Smith	1858	Colonies of M. rufinodis are found throughout South Australia and Victoria. Workers vary in length, measuring 16 to 20 millimetres (0.63 to 0.79 in). The males are 17 to 19 millimetres (0.67 to 0.75 in) and queens are 22 to 24 millimetres (0.87 to 0.94 in). The gaster, head and thorax are either black or blackish brown. The antennae, mandibles and tarsi are yellow, and parts of the legs and postpetiole are reddish yellow. The queens are larger and more robust than the workers. The males are completely black and the apex of the mandibles are brownish red. The antennae and postpetiole is red.
Myrmecia rugosa		Wheeler	1933	
Myrmecia simillima		Smith	1858	Colonies are found throughout New South Wales, South Australia and Victoria. Specimens are only known from workers and queens, measuring 19 to 23 millimetres (0.75 to 0.91 in) and 22 to 24 millimetres (0.87 to 0.94 in) respectively. The head, node, postpetiole and thorax are brown, and the gaster is black. The clypeus, legs, mandibles and scapes are reddish and the funiculus and tarsi are yellowish red.
Myrmecia subfasciata	—N/a	Viehmeyer	1924	
Myrmecia swalei		Crawley	1922	
Myrmecia tarsata		Smith	1858	M. tarsata is found throughout the eastern states and territories of Australia. Workers vary in length, measuring 14 to 23 millimetres (0.55 to 0.91 in). The males measure 18 to 19 millimetres (0.71 to 0.75 in) and queens are 20 to 24 millimetres (0.79 to 0.94 in). Some queens have stubby rudimentary wings while others are ergatoids. The head and thorax are bluish black, and the antennae, gaster, mandibles and tarsi are yellow or reddish yellow. Queens and workers appear similar, but the pubescence on the queen is more abundant and the mandibles are shorter and broader.
Myrmecia tepperi		Emery	1898	
Myrmecia testaceipes		Clark	1943	
Myrmecia tridentata		Ogata & Taylor	1991	
Myrmecia urens	—N/a	Lowne	1865	
Myrmecia varians		Mayr	1876	
Myrmecia vindex		Smith	1858	M. vindex is spread throughout Western Australia, particularly from Perth to Albany. Workers vary in length, measuring 17 to 23 millimetres (0.67 to 0.91 in). The queens measure 22 to 26.5 millimetres (0.87 to 1.04 in) and males are 15.5 to 18 millimetres (0.61 to 0.71 in). The head, legs, node, postpetiole and thorax are ferruginous, but the head is sometimes darker. The clypeus, labrum and mandibles are yellow, and the antennae and tarsi is testaceous. The gaster is black or brownish black.
