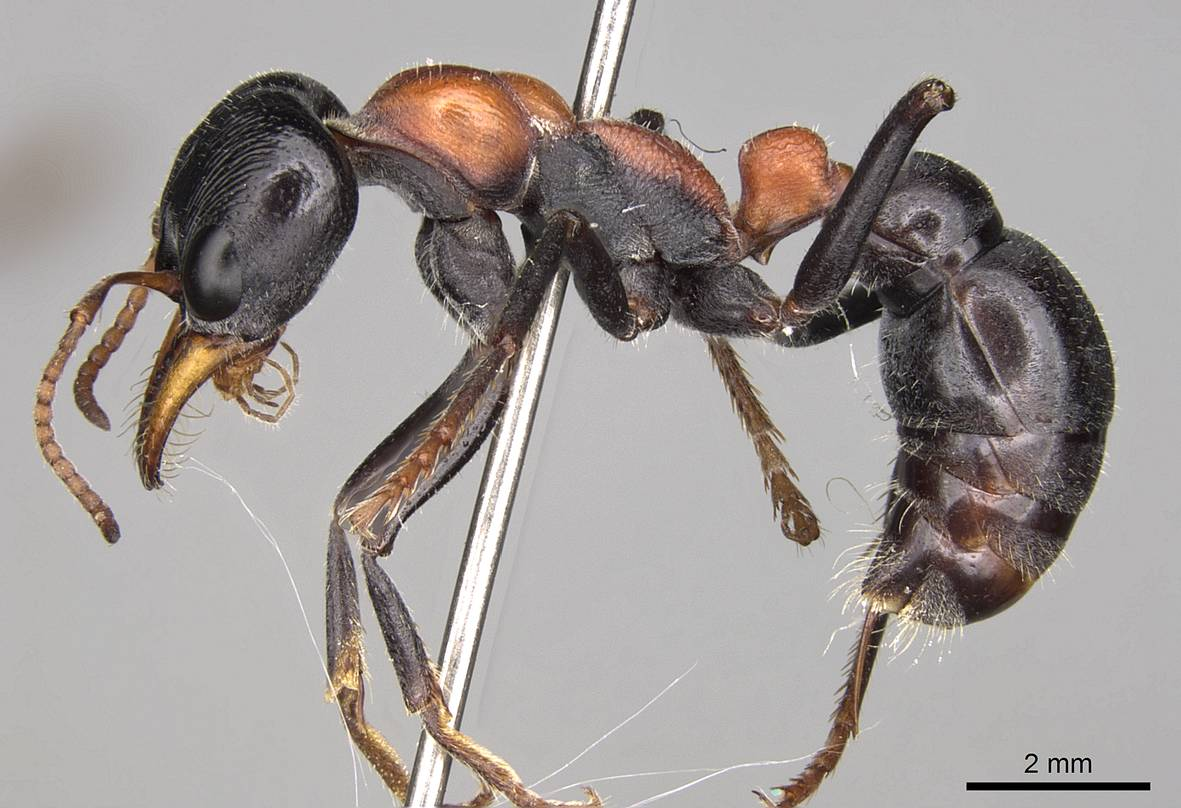
- Worker

Scientific classification
- Kingdom: Animalia
- Phylum: Arthropoda
- Class: Insecta
- Order: Hymenoptera
- Family: Formicidae
- Subfamily: Myrmeciinae
- Genus: Myrmecia
- Species: M. nobilis

Binomial name
- Myrmecia nobilis Clark, 1943

= Myrmecia nobilis =

Species of ant

Myrmecia nobilis is a species of ant. It belongs to the genus Myrmecia, and was described by John S. Clark in 1943. Native to Australia, Myrmecia nobilis has only been observed in Victoria, particularly the Melbourne Metropolitan Area.

Myrmecia nobilis looks like M. froggatti and M. maura and appears to be closely related to them, but all are distinct species. Myrmecia nobilis is around 10-14 millimetres long. Its mandibles are yellowish red, and its mesonotum, epinotum and node are red.
