= Myrmecia flammicollis =

Scientific classification
- Kingdom: Animalia
- Phylum: Arthropoda
- Class: Insecta
- Order: Hymenoptera
- Family: Formicidae
- Subfamily: Myrmeciinae
- Genus: Myrmecia
- Species: M. flammicollis

Binomial name
- Myrmecia flammicollis Brown, 1953

Species of ant

Myrmecia flammicollis is an Australian ant which belongs to the genus Myrmecia. It is native to Australia. They are usually distributed in the north of Queensland. They were described by William Brown in 1953.

Myrmecia flammicollis resembles the M. petiolata. The body back of the Myrmecia flammicollis is black while prothorax is largely or completely an orange-red colour.
