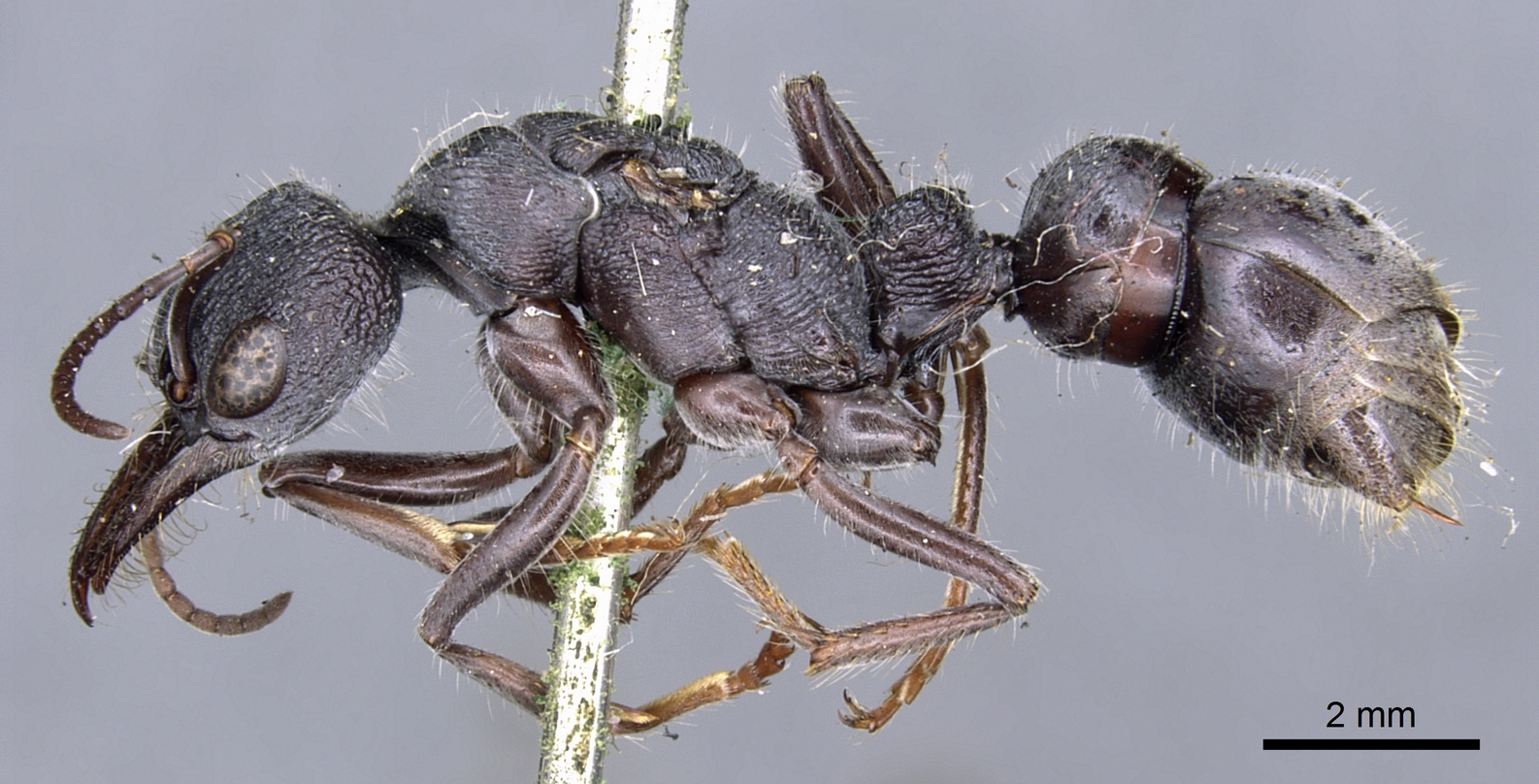

Scientific classification
- Kingdom: Animalia
- Phylum: Arthropoda
- Class: Insecta
- Order: Hymenoptera
- Family: Formicidae
- Subfamily: Myrmeciinae
- Genus: Myrmecia
- Species: M. rugosa

Binomial name
- Myrmecia rugosa Wheeler, 1933

= Myrmecia rugosa =

Species of ant

Myrmecia rugosa is an Australian ant which belongs to the genus Myrmecia. This species is native to Australia. Their distribution in Australia is nationwide but are not common in the northern regions of Australia.

Myrmecia rugosa has a similar appearance to the M. mandibularis. Most of the body is black with the exceptions of the mandibles, antennae, and legs, which are a dark brown colour.
