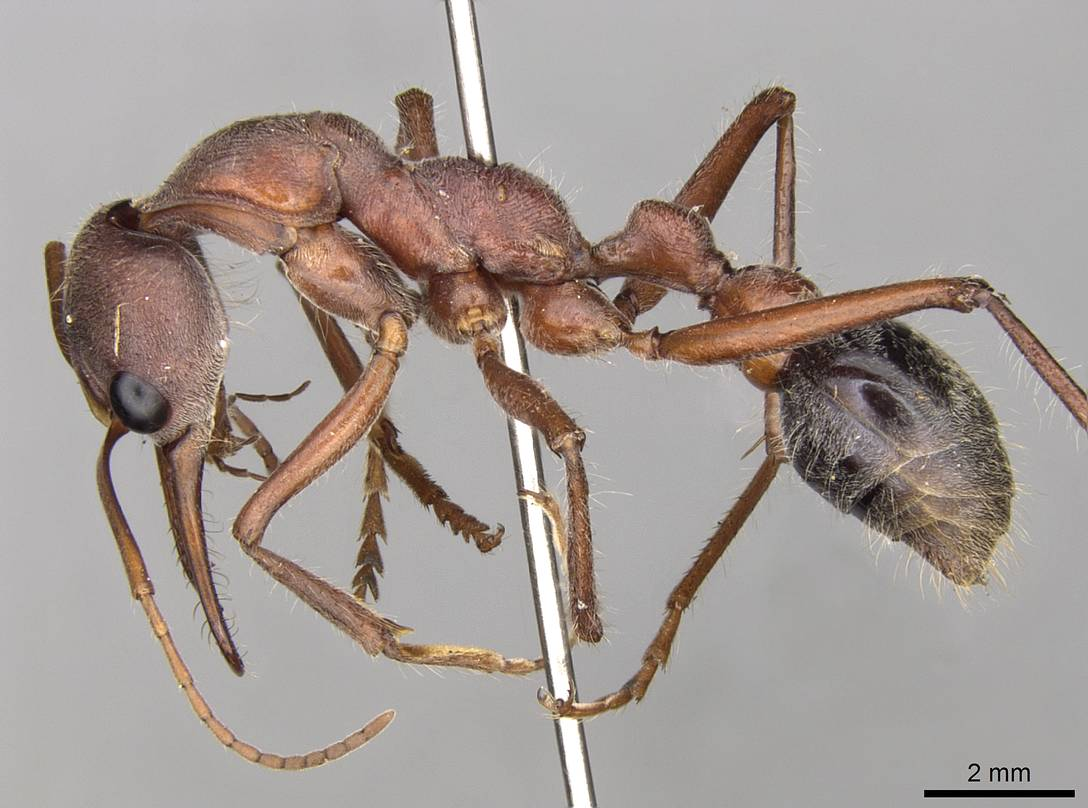
- Myrmecia comata worker

Scientific classification
- Kingdom: Animalia
- Phylum: Arthropoda
- Class: Insecta
- Order: Hymenoptera
- Family: Formicidae
- Subfamily: Myrmeciinae
- Genus: Myrmecia
- Species: M. comata

Binomial name
- Myrmecia comata Clark, 1951

= Myrmecia comata =

Species of ant

Myrmecia comata is an Australian ant in the genus Myrmecia. This species is native to Australia and distributed mostly around Queensland. It was described as a species by John S. Clark in 1951.

Myrmecia comata has some similarities with M. flavicoma. Workers grow can from 18 to 20 millimetres in length. The head, node, and postpetiole is a reddish-brown, gaster is black, and the mandibles, antennae, and legs are a yellowish-brown colour.
