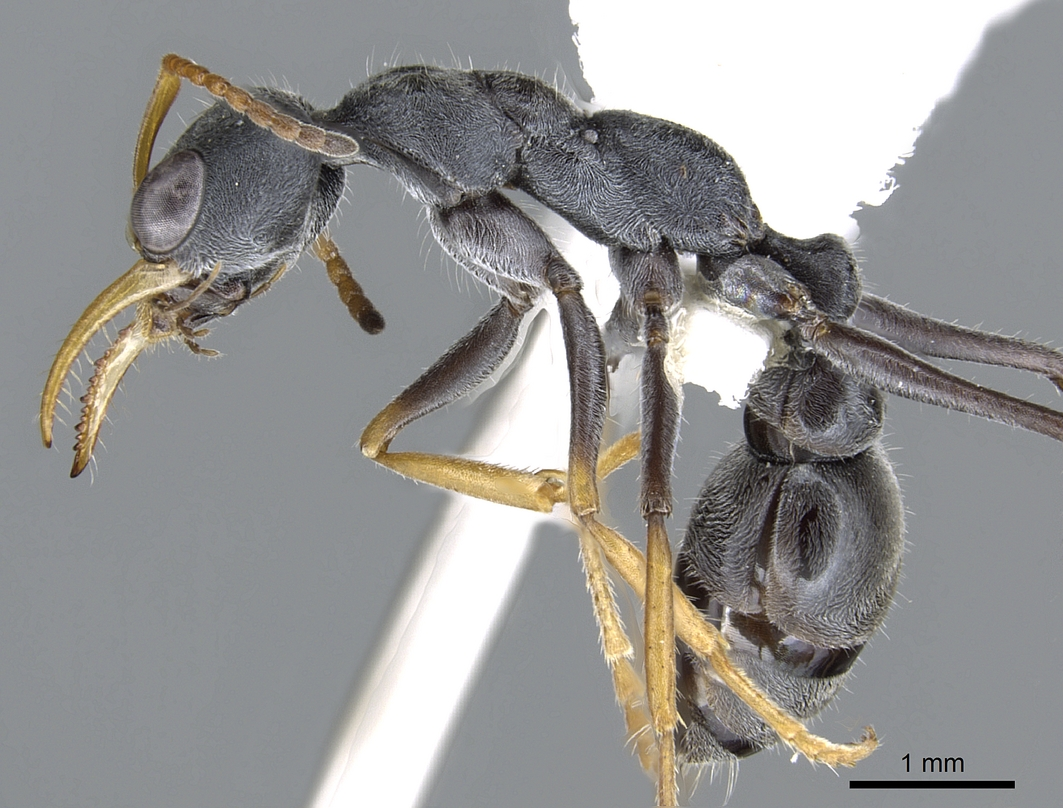
- Myrmecia loweryi worker

Scientific classification
- Kingdom: Animalia
- Phylum: Arthropoda
- Class: Insecta
- Order: Hymenoptera
- Family: Formicidae
- Subfamily: Myrmeciinae
- Genus: Myrmecia
- Species: M. loweryi

Binomial name
- Myrmecia loweryi Ogata & Taylor, 1991

= Myrmecia loweryi =

Species of ant

Myrmecia loweryi is a species of the giant bull ant which is abundant to Australia. Myrmecia loweryi is one of the latest species of bull ant to be described, which was back in 1991 by Ogata & Taylor. They are mostly located around New South Wales and the Australian Capital Territory.

Their exact appearance is of the jack jumper ant. The colours features and size are strikingly similar to it as well. However, they are most likely to be less aggressive and dangerous.
