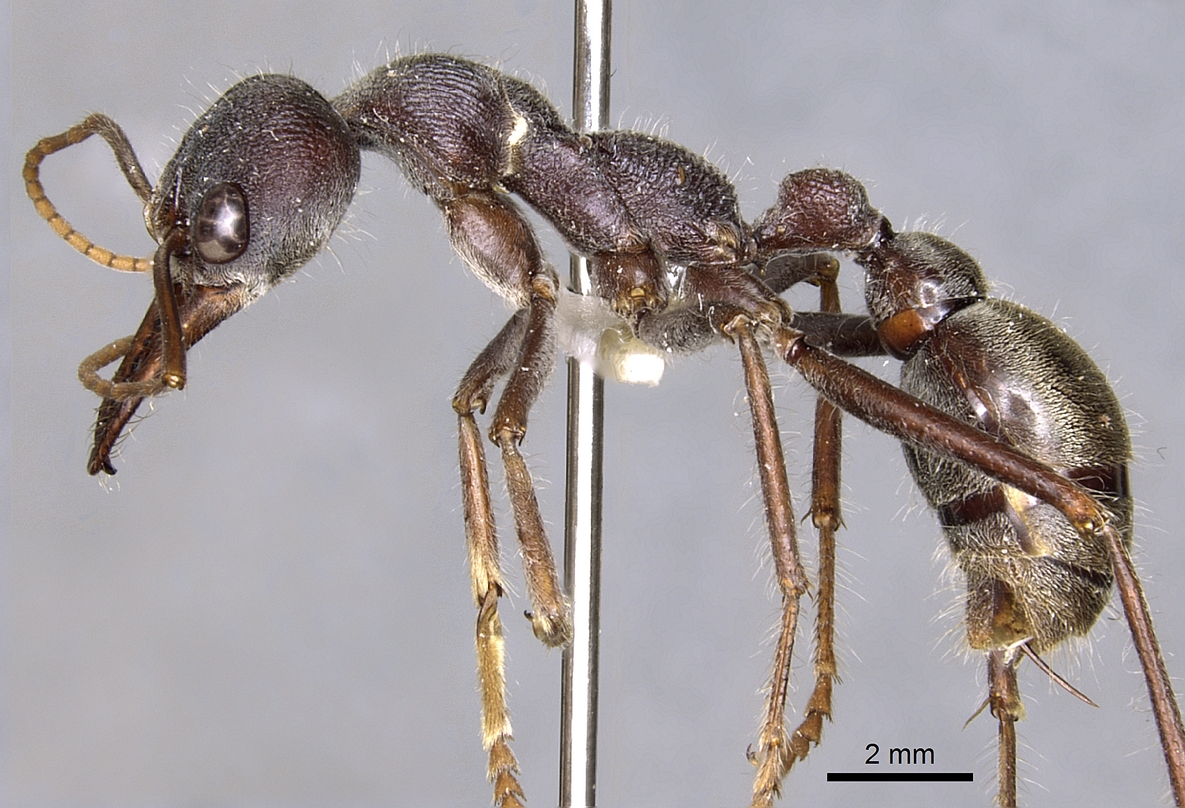

Scientific classification
- Kingdom: Animalia
- Phylum: Arthropoda
- Class: Insecta
- Order: Hymenoptera
- Family: Formicidae
- Subfamily: Myrmeciinae
- Genus: Myrmecia
- Species: M. fabricii

Binomial name
- Myrmecia fabricii Ogata & Taylor, 1991

= Myrmecia fabricii =

Species of ant

Myrmecia fabricii is an Australian ant in the genus Myrmecia native to Australia, with specimens mainly found in the state of Queensland. It was described by Ogata and Taylor in 1991.

Their appearance is similar to jack jumper ants, but more of a dark brownish colour with darker jaws and darker legs.
