= Myrmecia fulgida =

Scientific classification
- Kingdom: Animalia
- Phylum: Arthropoda
- Clade: Pancrustacea
- Class: Insecta
- Order: Hymenoptera
- Family: Formicidae
- Subfamily: Myrmeciinae
- Genus: Myrmecia
- Species: M. fulgida

Binomial name
- Myrmecia fulgida Clark, 1951

Species of ant

Myrmecia fulgida is an Australian ant which belongs to the genus Myrmecia. This species is native to Australia. Their distribution mostly in Western Australia and some areas of the east of Australia.

Myrmecia fulgida is a large bull ant species. Their lengths for an average worker is 24-26 millimetres long. The head and thorax is a brownish red colour. The legs are lighter as well as the antennae. The gaster is black while the mandibles are a yellow colour.
