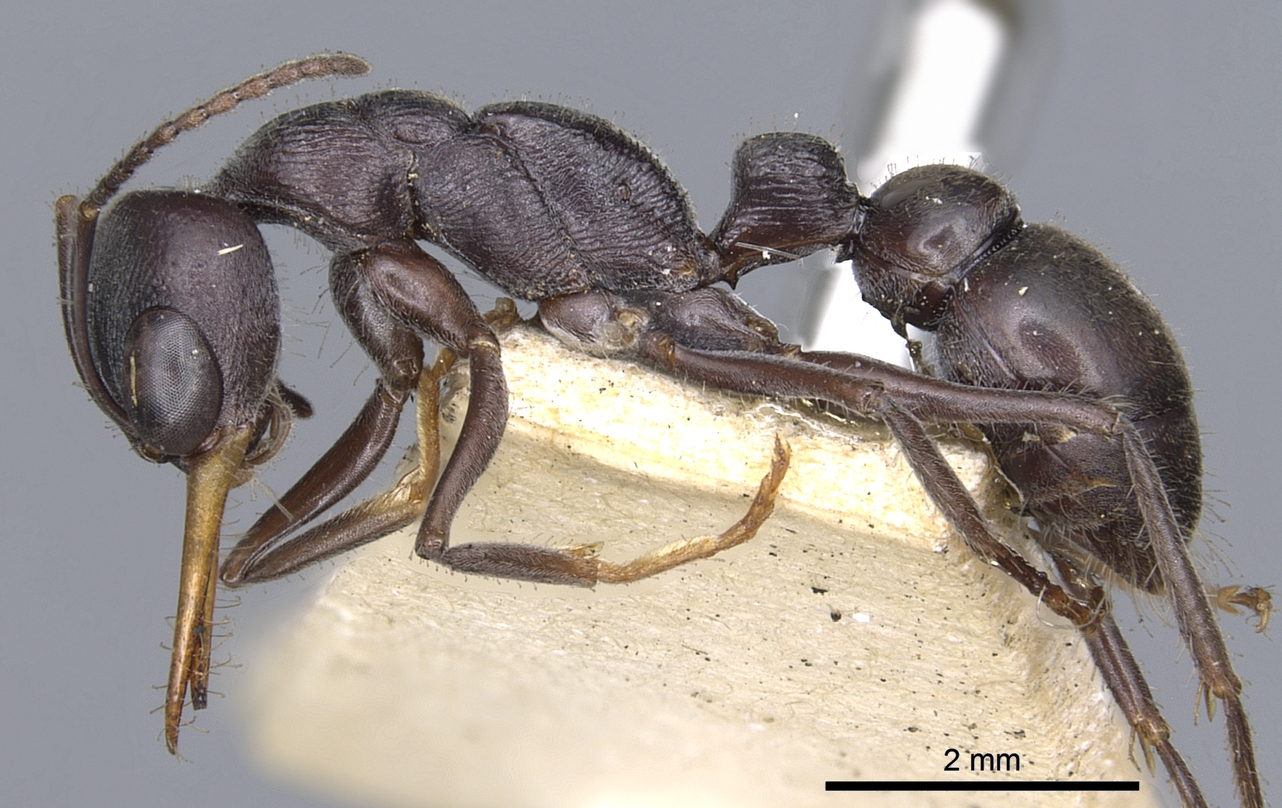

Scientific classification
- Kingdom: Animalia
- Phylum: Arthropoda
- Class: Insecta
- Order: Hymenoptera
- Family: Formicidae
- Subfamily: Myrmeciinae
- Genus: Myrmecia
- Species: M. clarki

Binomial name
- Myrmecia clarki Crawley, 1922

= Myrmecia clarki =

Species of ant endemic to Australia

Myrmecia clarki is an Australian ant which belongs to the genus Myrmecia. This species is endemic to Australia and is commonly distributed in Western Australia. The average length for this species is typically around 16-16.5 millimetres long. Males are smaller at 11-12 millimetres long and queens are normally bigger. They are similar to the jack jumper ant. They are mostly black, with the exception of their mandibles being yellow and the legs being blackish-brown.
