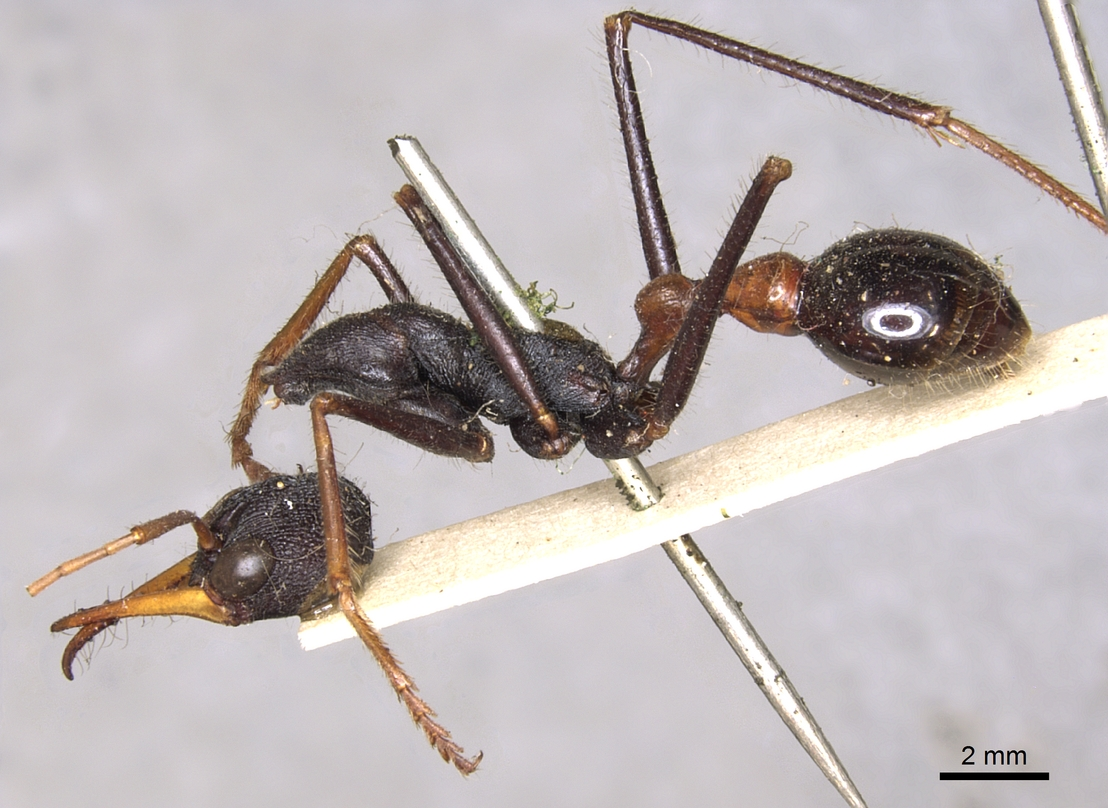

Scientific classification
- Kingdom: Animalia
- Phylum: Arthropoda
- Class: Insecta
- Order: Hymenoptera
- Family: Formicidae
- Subfamily: Myrmeciinae
- Genus: Myrmecia
- Species: M. rufinodis

Binomial name
- Myrmecia rufinodis Smith, 1858

= Myrmecia rufinodis =

Species of ant

Myrmecia rufinodis is an Australian ant which belongs to the genus Myrmecia. This species is native to Australia. Their distribution in Australia can be commonly found in South Australia. It was described by Fredrick Smith in 1858.

The lengths for a worker ant is around 16-20 millimetres long. Queens are 22-24 millimetres and the males are around 17-19 millimetres. Head and thorax is black, or a blackish brown, the mandibles, antennae, and tarsi are yellow, and legs are reddish-yellow.
