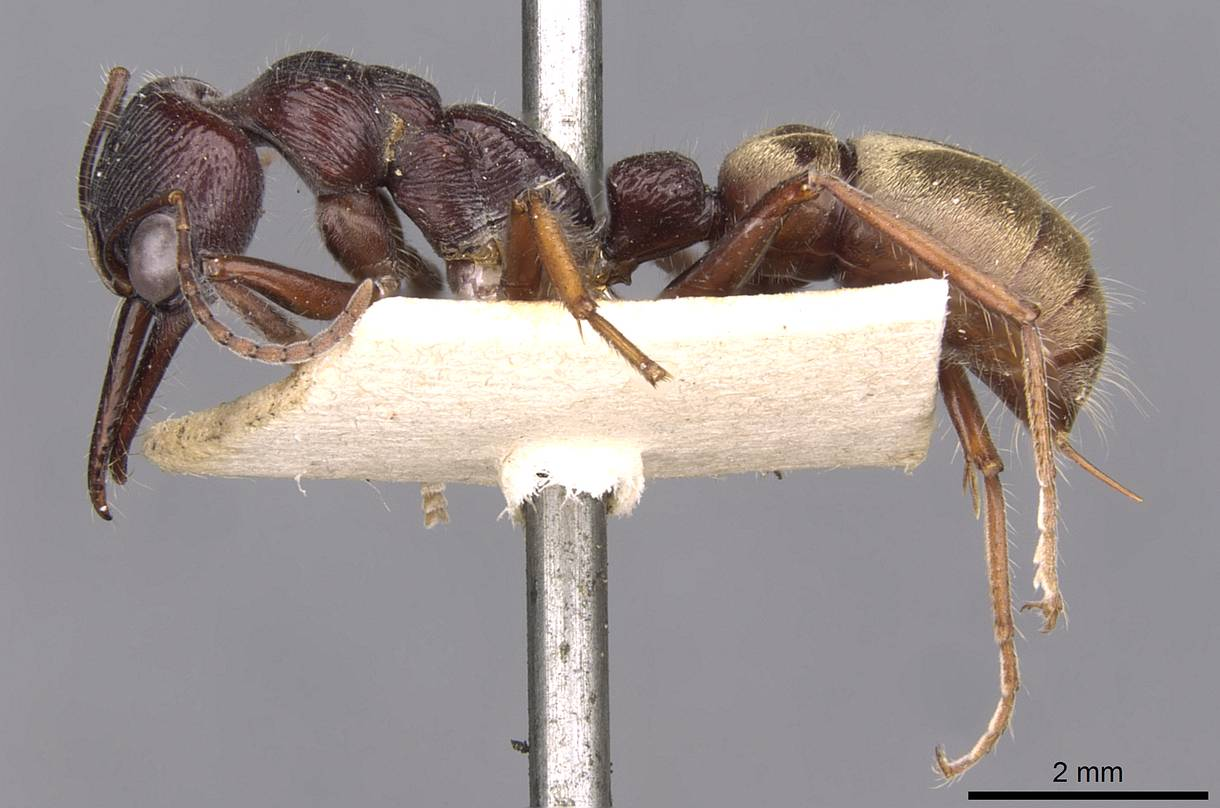

Scientific classification
- Kingdom: Animalia
- Phylum: Arthropoda
- Class: Insecta
- Order: Hymenoptera
- Family: Formicidae
- Subfamily: Myrmeciinae
- Genus: Myrmecia
- Species: M. piliventris

Binomial name
- Myrmecia piliventris Smith, 1858

= Myrmecia piliventris =

Species of ant endemic to Australia

Myrmecia piliventris, the golden tail bull ant, is an Australian ant which belongs to the genus Myrmecia. This species is native to Australia. The Myrmecia piliventris is distributed Australia wide, but they're not too common in the western regions of Australia.

== Characteristics ==
The typical size for a worker is around 10–15.5 millimetres long. The species is black mostly, with the exceptions where the mandibles, antennae and legs are dark brown. The tarsi is lighter but with a more reddish tone. The abdomen is a golden yellow colour. They have similarities to some Myrmecia species as they do not have teeth, which most of its kind contain.

Myrmecia piliventris has a genome similar to that of the jack jumper ant. However its chromosome complement is n=2, higher than the jack jumper ant, but most of its relatives of the genus Myrmecia have a much higher chromosome count.
