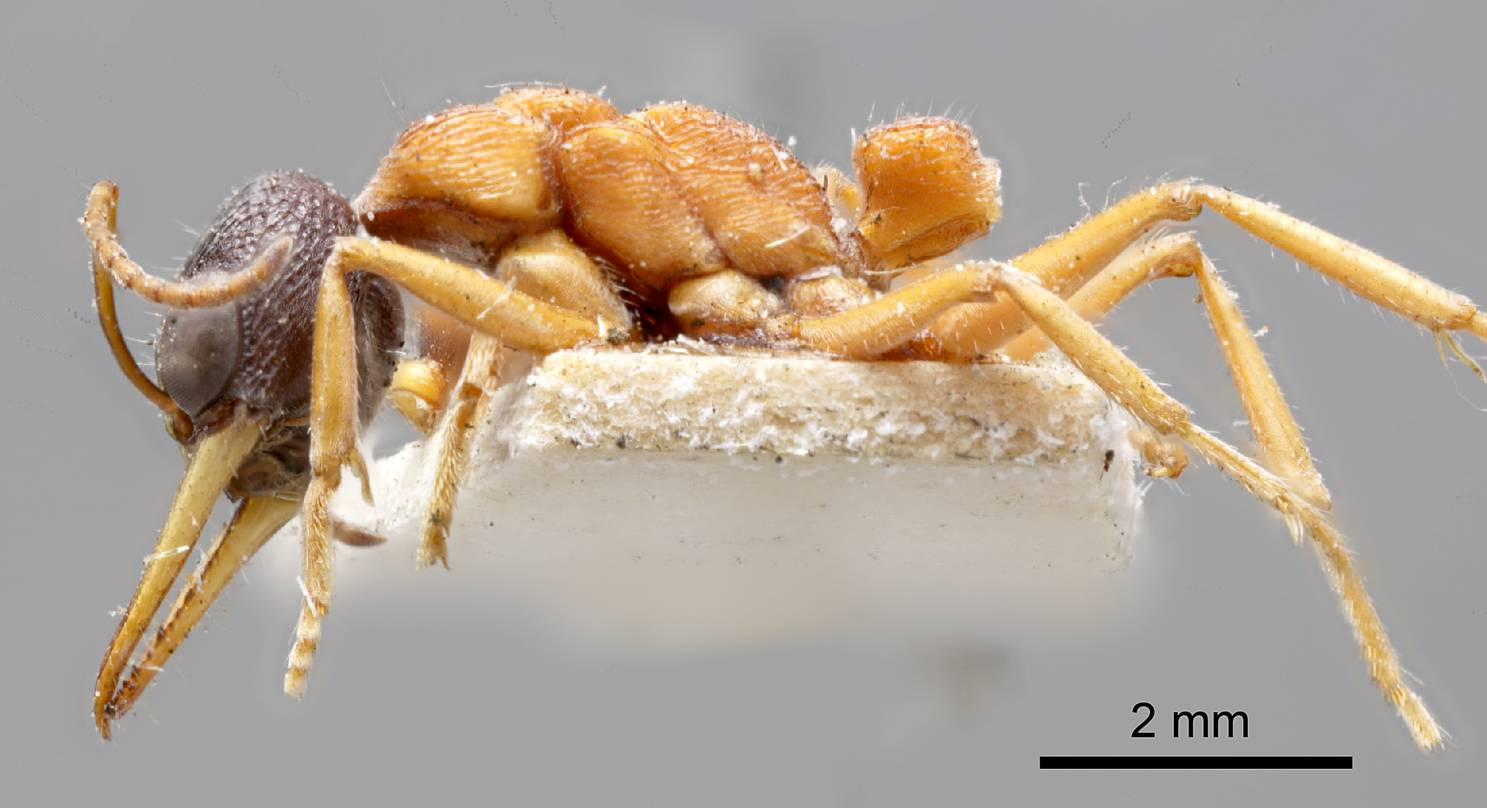

Scientific classification
- Kingdom: Animalia
- Phylum: Arthropoda
- Clade: Pancrustacea
- Class: Insecta
- Order: Hymenoptera
- Family: Formicidae
- Subfamily: Myrmeciinae
- Genus: Myrmecia
- Species: M. testaceipes

Binomial name
- Myrmecia testaceipes Clark, 1943

= Myrmecia testaceipes =

Species of ant

Myrmecia testaceipes is an Australian ant which belongs to the genus Myrmecia. This species is native to Australia. The distribution of Myrmecia testaceipes is throughout all of the southern states of Australia. It was described as a species by John S. Clark in 1943.

The length of a worker ant in this species is around 10–11 millimetres. The head and gaster is black, thorax and node is a reddish-yellow colour. Mandibles, antennae, and legs are a yellow colour. A small part of the mandibles are however a brown colour.
