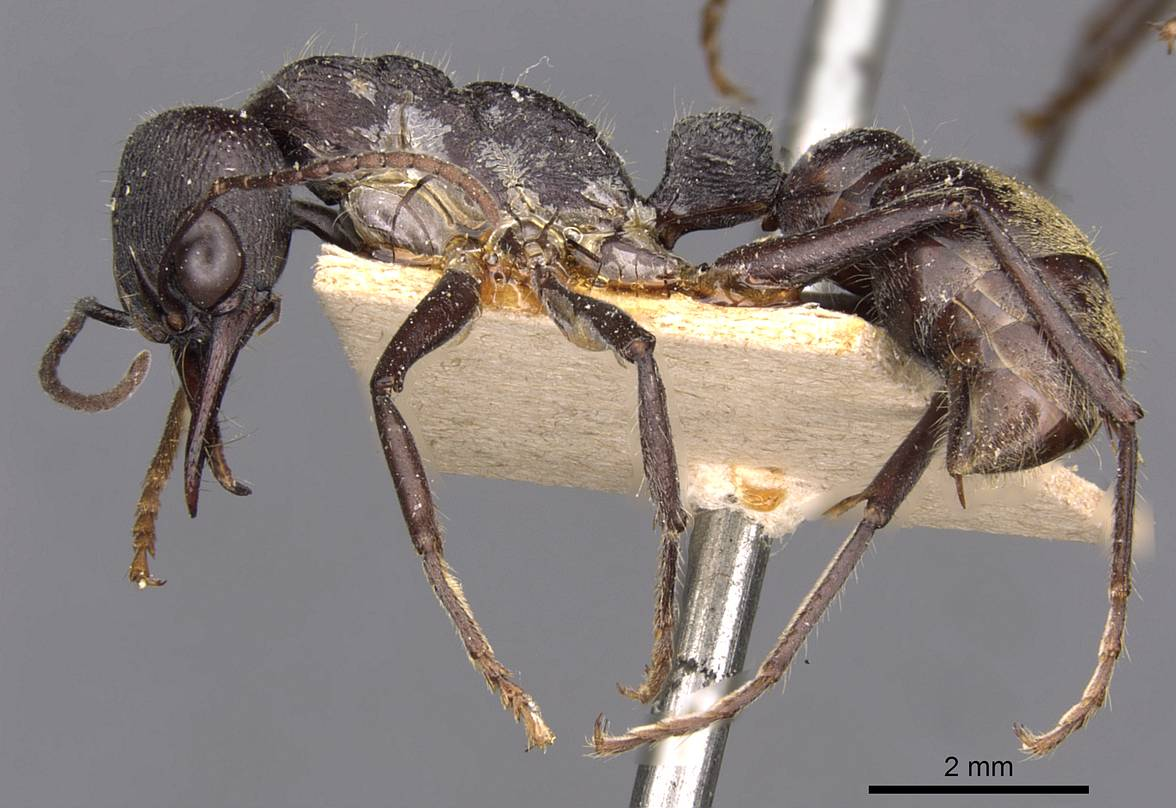

Scientific classification
- Kingdom: Animalia
- Phylum: Arthropoda
- Class: Insecta
- Order: Hymenoptera
- Family: Formicidae
- Subfamily: Myrmeciinae
- Genus: Myrmecia
- Species: M. gilberti

Binomial name
- Myrmecia gilberti Forel, 1910

= Myrmecia gilberti =

Species of ant

Myrmecia gilberti is an Australian ant which belongs to the genus Myrmecia. This species is native to Australia. This species is distributed throughout all of the eastern states and regions of Australia.

Their appearance is similar to the jack jumper ant. Workers grow from a lot of sizes ranging from 9.5 to 15 millimetres in length, while females grow to 16.5 millimetres and the males only grow to 11.5 millimetres. The mandibles, legs, and antennae is a brown colour, but the tarsi is a lighter colour. The head is black while the thorax is between black and a golden yellow on top of the thorax.
