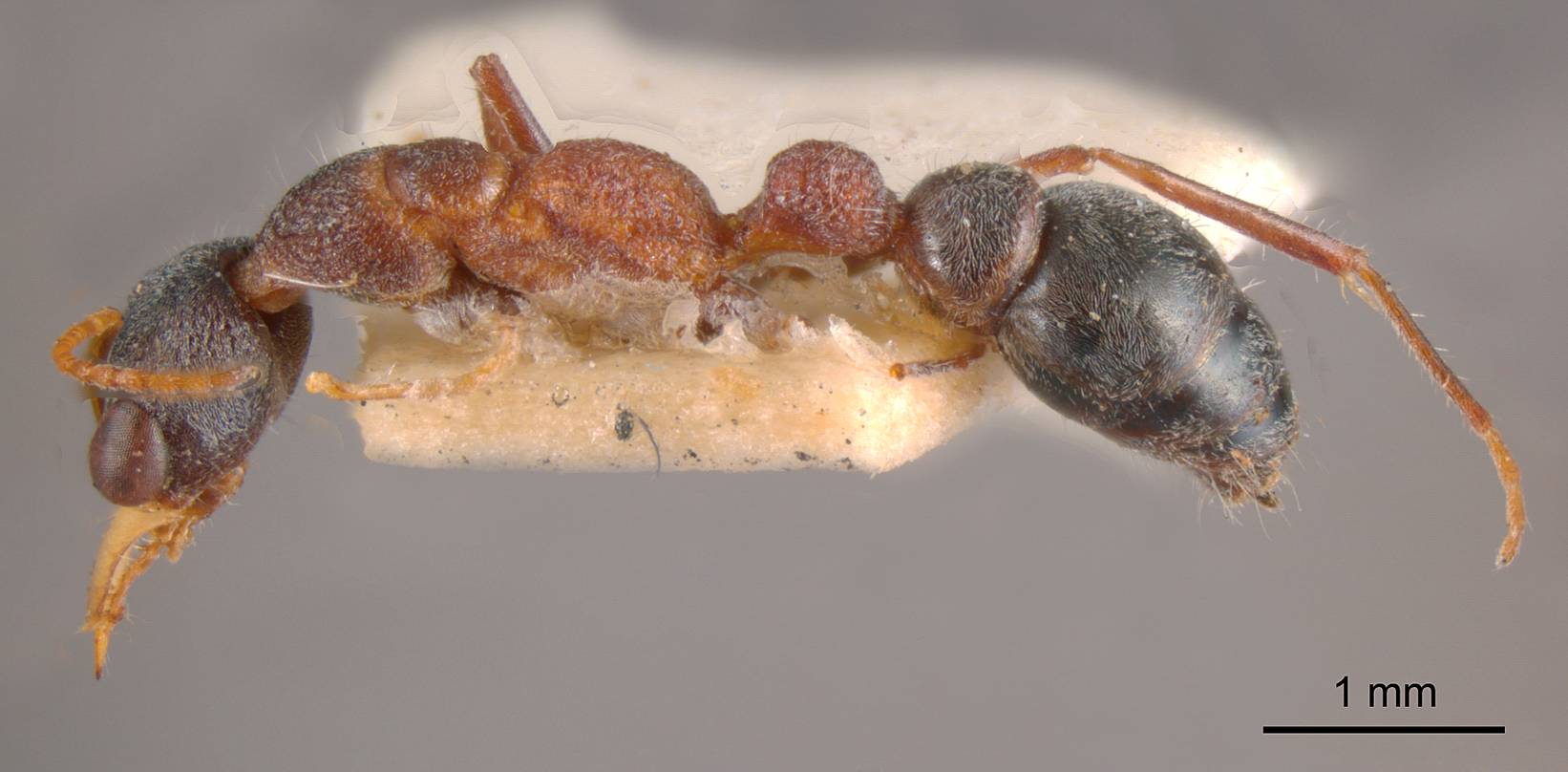

Scientific classification
- Kingdom: Animalia
- Phylum: Arthropoda
- Class: Insecta
- Order: Hymenoptera
- Family: Formicidae
- Subfamily: Myrmeciinae
- Genus: Myrmecia
- Species: M. exigua

Binomial name
- Myrmecia exigua Clark, 1943

= Myrmecia exigua =

Species of ant

Myrmecia exigua is an Australian ant which belongs to the genus Myrmecia. This species is native to Australia. Myrmecia exigua has only been observed in the north west of Victoria. It was first described by John S. Clark in 1943.

The Myrmecia exigua is one of the smallest species of bull ants. The head and gaster are a blackish-brown colour, mandibles yellow; antennae, pronotum, legs and several other features are brown, almost all of the tarsi is a reddish yellow colour, and the node is a red colour.
