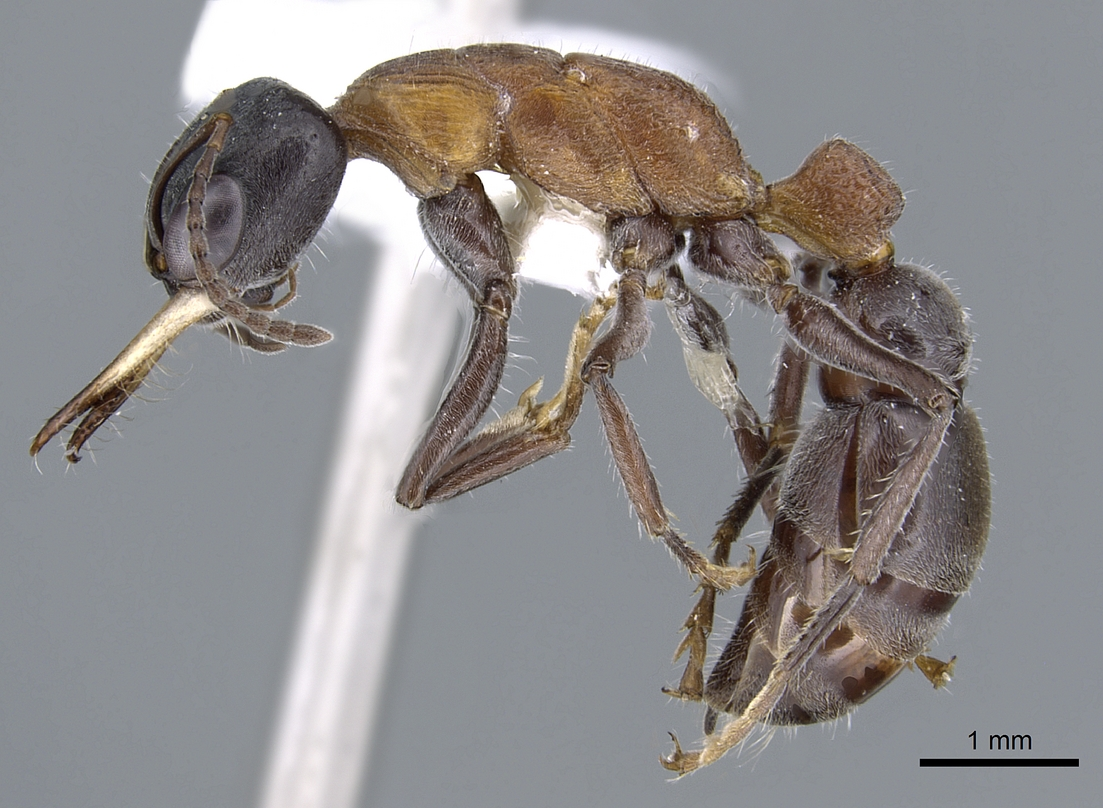

Scientific classification
- Kingdom: Animalia
- Phylum: Arthropoda
- Class: Insecta
- Order: Hymenoptera
- Family: Formicidae
- Subfamily: Myrmeciinae
- Genus: Myrmecia
- Species: M. acuta

Binomial name
- Myrmecia acuta Ogata & Taylor, 1991

= Myrmecia acuta =

Species of ant endemic to Australia

Myrmecia acuta is an Australian ant which belongs to the genus Myrmecia, and is endemic to Australia, usually found in Western Australia and some areas of South Australia. Myrmecia acuta was first described in 1991.
