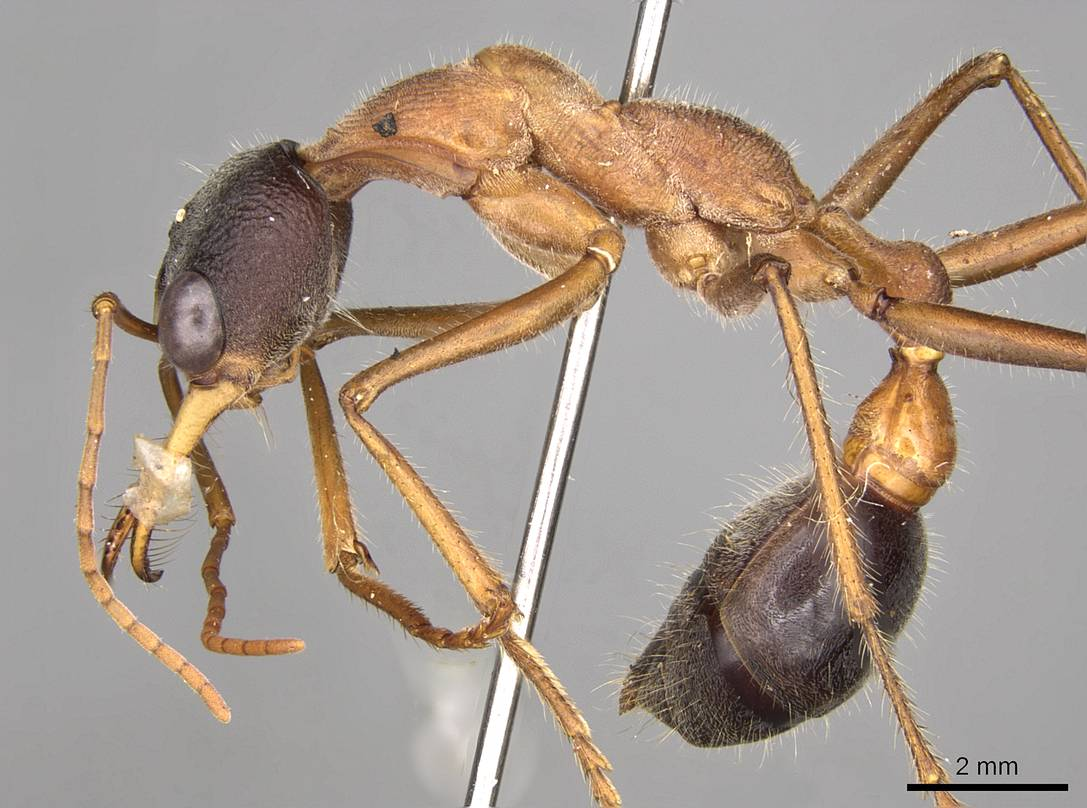
- Worker

Scientific classification
- Kingdom: Animalia
- Phylum: Arthropoda
- Class: Insecta
- Order: Hymenoptera
- Family: Formicidae
- Subfamily: Myrmeciinae
- Genus: Myrmecia
- Species: M. desertorum

Binomial name
- Myrmecia desertorum Wheeler, 1915

= Myrmecia desertorum =

Species of ant endemic to Australia

Myrmecia desertorum is an Australian ant species belonging to the genus Myrmecia. They were first described by Wheeler in 1915, and are distributed all over Australia.

Myrmecia desertorum are common nationwide. They are typically 18-26 millimetres long. They are usually a reddish yellow colour. Their heads and gaster are in a blackish brown colour, and mandibles and clypeus are of a yellow colour.

== Behaviour ==
Myrmecia desertorum are highly aggressive ants. They are nocturnal and blend easily into a background of dry leaf-litter. They do not lay pheromone trails for foraging and are solitary foragers. They establish permanent nests which resemble huge crater-like depressions, with several nest openings. A poke into any of these openings results in a surge of workers running out with mandibles wide open. They have extraordinarily large eyes. They primarily feed on insects. It was in these ants that an antibiotic in the metapleural gland was discovered.
