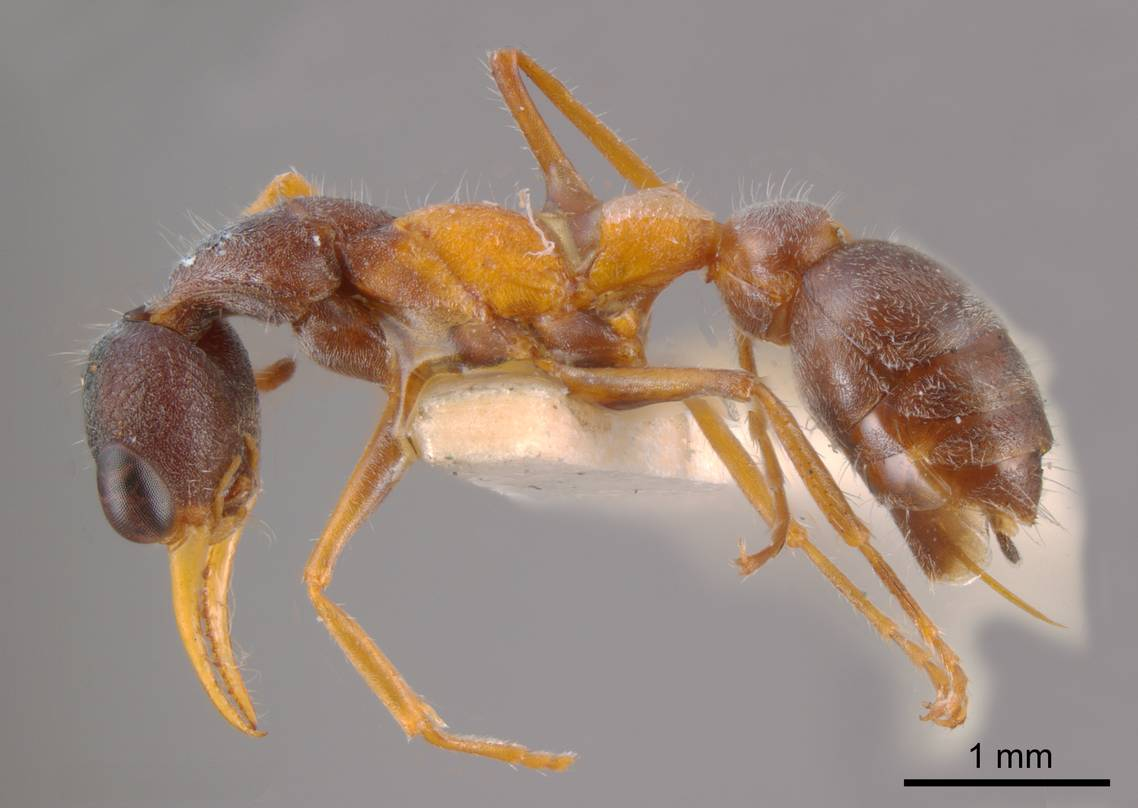

Scientific classification
- Kingdom: Animalia
- Phylum: Arthropoda
- Class: Insecta
- Order: Hymenoptera
- Family: Formicidae
- Subfamily: Myrmeciinae
- Genus: Myrmecia
- Species: M. rubicunda

Binomial name
- Myrmecia rubicunda Clark, 1943

= Myrmecia rubicunda =

Species of ant

Myrmecia rubicunda is an Australian ant which belongs to the genus Myrmecia. This species is native to Australia. They are rarely seen outside the state of South Australia.

Myrmecia rubicunda is a small bull ant species. Mandibles and labrum are yellow, all legs are reddish. The head and thorax are darker brown, and the middle of the body is tan brown in colour.
