= Myrmecia formosa =

Scientific classification
- Kingdom: Animalia
- Phylum: Arthropoda
- Class: Insecta
- Order: Hymenoptera
- Family: Formicidae
- Subfamily: Myrmeciinae
- Genus: Myrmecia
- Species: M. formosa

Binomial name
- Myrmecia formosa Wheeler, 1933

Species of ant

Myrmecia formosa is an Australian ant which belongs to the genus Myrmecia. This species is native to Australia. Their distribution in Australia has notably been studied and collected in New South Wales.

Myrmecia formosa is a small species, as the typical size for a worker in the species is only 10–13 millimetres in length. The clypeus, pronotum, mesonotum, and the node is a blood red colour, the gaster, sides of the thorax, half of the head and other features are black, legs are brown, tarsi is a reddish like colour, and the mandibles and antennae are a reddish yellow. This species compared to others is rather unusual with its colours.
