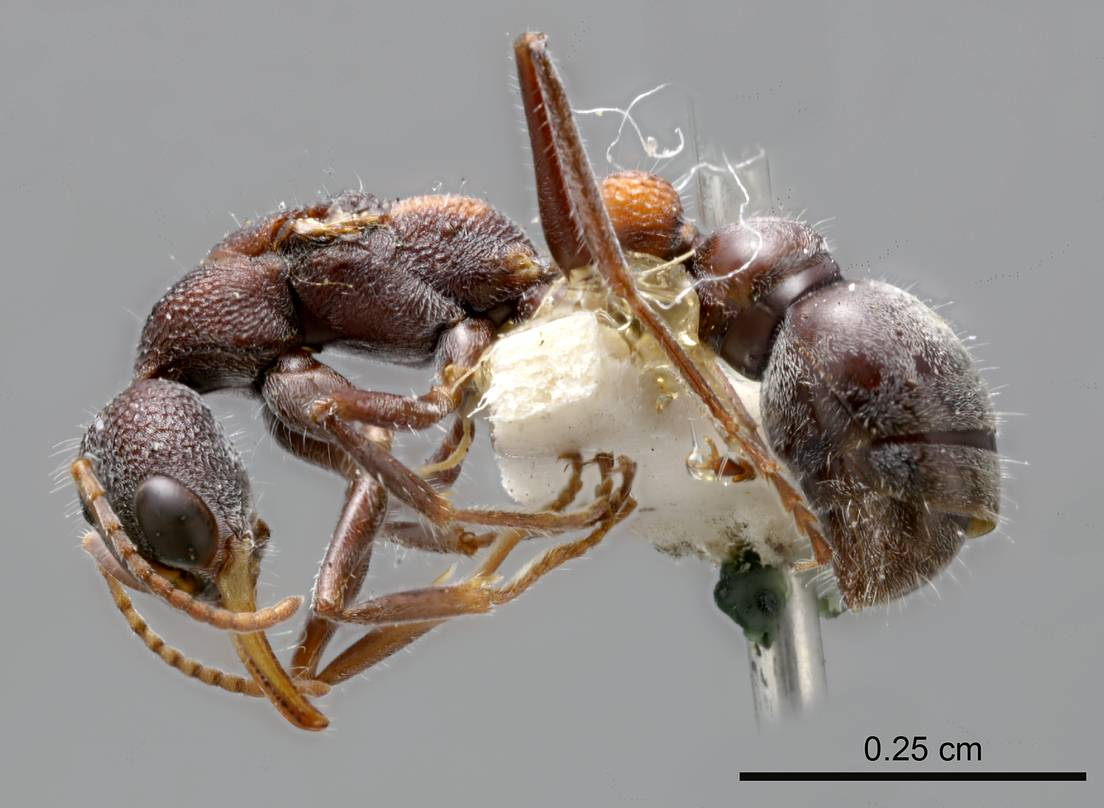

Scientific classification
- Kingdom: Animalia
- Phylum: Arthropoda
- Class: Insecta
- Order: Hymenoptera
- Family: Formicidae
- Subfamily: Myrmeciinae
- Genus: Myrmecia
- Species: M. dichospila

Binomial name
- Myrmecia dichospila Clark, 1938

= Myrmecia dichospila =

Species of ant endemic to Australia

Myrmecia dichospila is an Australian ant which belongs to the genus Myrmecia. This species is endemic to Australia and is heavily distributed in South Australia and have some presence in other several states.

== Description ==
Myrmecia dichospila is a small bull ant species. The average length is only 7-9 millimetres, but males are somewhat bigger at 11 millimetres. Mandibles are yellow, and most of the body is completely black. It has similarities to the M. pilosula.
