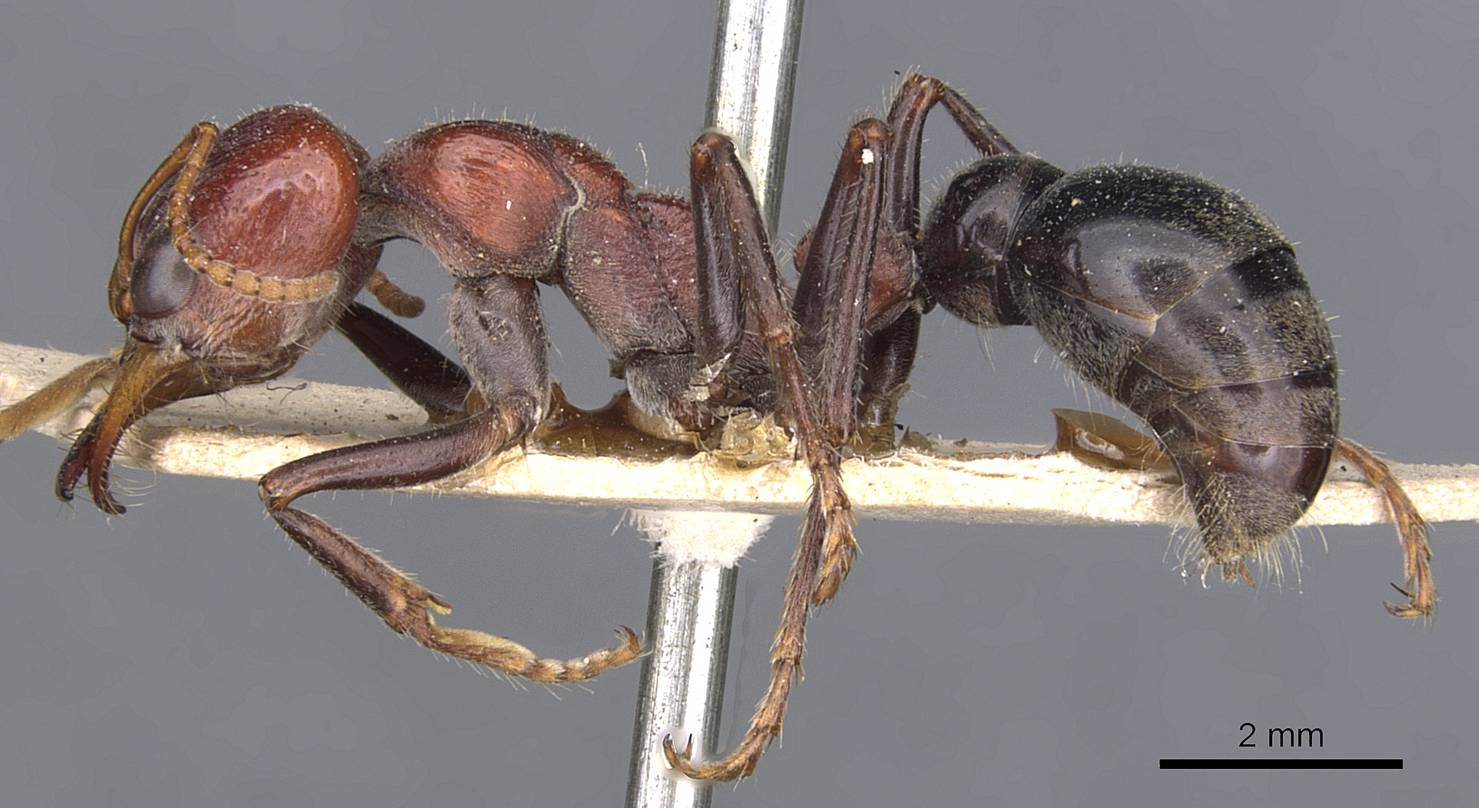
- Myrmecia froggatti worker

Scientific classification
- Kingdom: Animalia
- Phylum: Arthropoda
- Clade: Pancrustacea
- Class: Insecta
- Order: Hymenoptera
- Family: Formicidae
- Subfamily: Myrmeciinae
- Genus: Myrmecia
- Species: M. froggatti

Binomial name
- Myrmecia froggatti Forel, 1910

= Myrmecia froggatti =

Species of ant endemic to Australia

Myrmecia froggatti is an Australian ant which belongs to the genus Myrmecia. This species is endemic to Australia. This species is distributed throughout all areas of New South Wales and elsewhere up north and south.

The length for the workers is around 11–12 millimetres long. Queens are 14.5 millimetres and length for males are smaller, but the length is not precisely known. They are dark red bull ants. The gaster is black, legs and front of the face is brownish black; the mandibles, antennae, and tarsi is yellow. The mandibles are notably small, which is similar with the M. aberrans.
