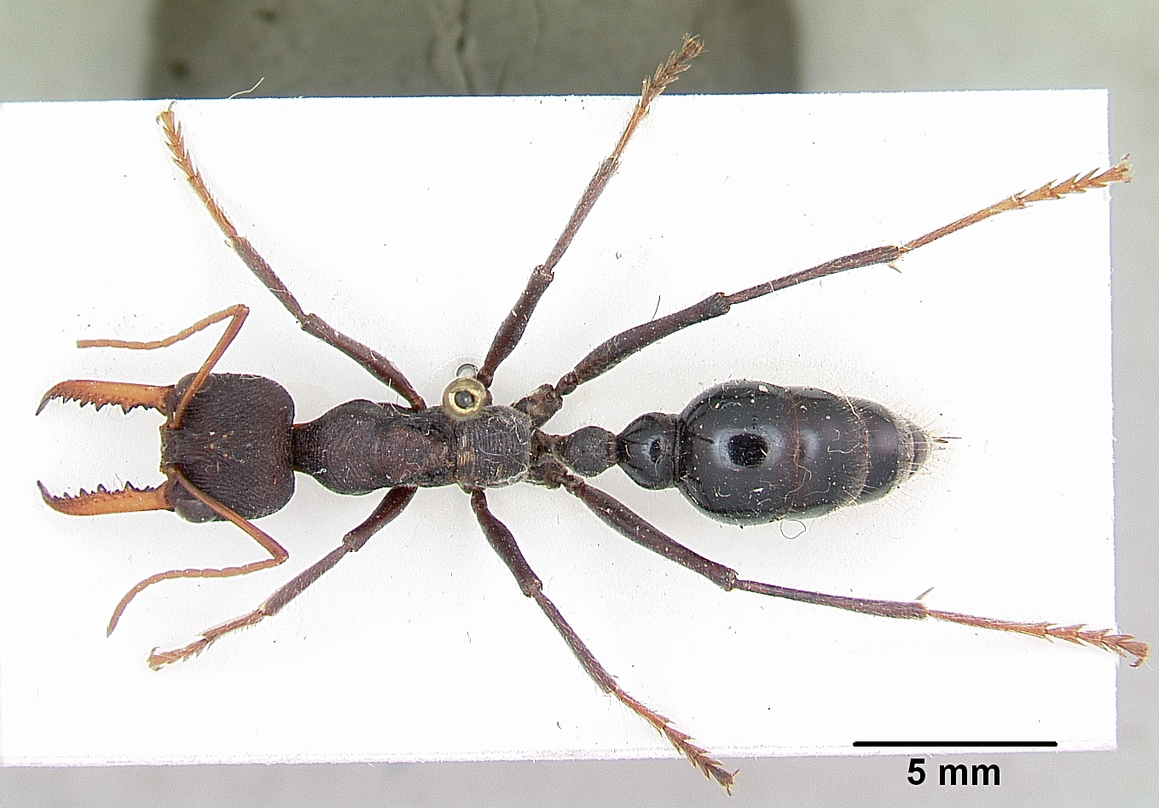
- Myrmecia tarsata specimen

Scientific classification
- Kingdom: Animalia
- Phylum: Arthropoda
- Class: Insecta
- Order: Hymenoptera
- Family: Formicidae
- Subfamily: Myrmeciinae
- Genus: Myrmecia
- Species: M. tarsata

Binomial name
- Myrmecia tarsata Smith, 1858

= Myrmecia tarsata =

Species of ant

Myrmecia tarsata is a bull ant species native to Australia. The species belongs to the genus Myrmecia. Their distribution is large, mainly around New South Wales and the Australian Capital Territory.

== Appearance ==
Myrmecia tarsata is quite a large bull ant at 22–24 millimetres (0.87–0.94 in) long, with the males being slightly smaller. The head, thorax, and other distinct features are mainly black, mandibles are yellow, and legs look to be a reddish yellow colour.

The species of Myrmecia tarsata are known to have the gamergates gene, which workers are able to reproduce. This gene allows their colonies to last a while without a queen.
