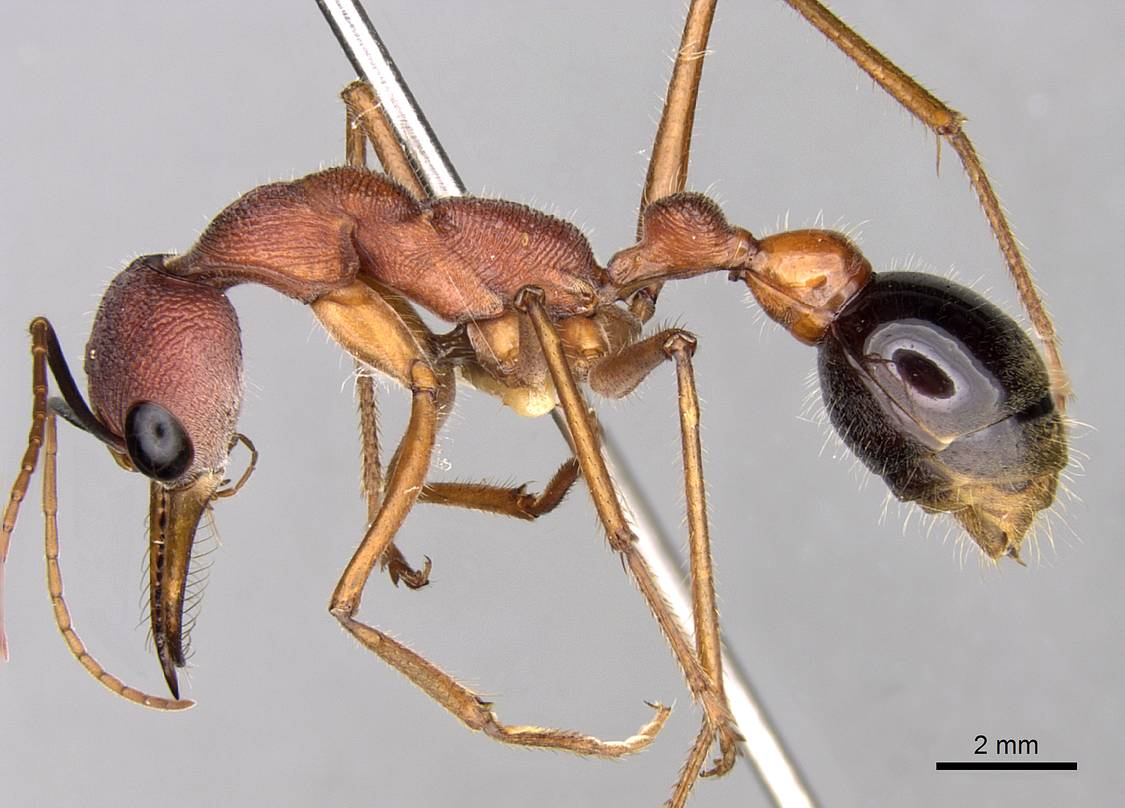

Scientific classification
- Kingdom: Animalia
- Phylum: Arthropoda
- Class: Insecta
- Order: Hymenoptera
- Family: Formicidae
- Subfamily: Myrmeciinae
- Genus: Myrmecia
- Species: M. analis

Binomial name
- Myrmecia analis Mayr, 1862

Synonyms
- Myrmecia atriscapa Crawley, 1925

= Myrmecia analis =

Species of ant endemic to Western Australia

Myrmecia analis is a species of the genus Myrmecia. Myrmecia analis is usually only found in Western Australia. It was described by Mayr in 1862.

Myrmecia analis are around 20-22 millimetres long on average. However, some workers can be slightly smaller and their colour tone similar to Myrmecia vindex, but with the head slightly darker. The mandibles are around 3-4 millimeters long.
