= Myrmecia callima =

Scientific classification
- Kingdom: Animalia
- Phylum: Arthropoda
- Class: Insecta
- Order: Hymenoptera
- Family: Formicidae
- Subfamily: Myrmeciinae
- Genus: Myrmecia
- Species: M. callima

Binomial name
- Myrmecia callima Clark, 1943

Species of ant endemic to Australia

Myrmecia callima is an Australian ant which belongs to the genus Myrmecia. This species is endemic to Australia. Myrmecia callima is typically distributed in the more western regions of Australia.

The average length for this species is around 12.5-14 millimetres long. Their head is black, antennae, thorax, node, and other features are a yellowish-red colour. Mandibles and legs are in a yellow colour.
