= Myrmecia pavida =

Scientific classification
- Kingdom: Animalia
- Phylum: Arthropoda
- Class: Insecta
- Order: Hymenoptera
- Family: Formicidae
- Subfamily: Myrmeciinae
- Genus: Myrmecia
- Species: M. pavida

Binomial name
- Myrmecia pavida Clark, 1951

Species of ant endemic to Australia

Myrmecia pavida is a bull ant species that lives in and is native to Australia. Described by John S. Clark in 1951, the Myrmecia Pavida is distributed and has been mainly collected from the states of Western Australia and South Australia.

The average length of a worker is 19-22 millimeters. Queens are larger at over 25 millimeters in length. The head and gaster are black. The thorax, node, legs, and other features are brown. The antennae and tarsi are red, and the mandibles and clypeus are yellow.

== Biology and behavior ==
Like other ants of the genus Myrmecia, Myrmecia pavida has excellent vision. They are mostly nocturnal. It can spot predators from 1–2 metres (3 ft 3 in – 6 ft 7 in). They are also highly aggressive when potential intruders and humans disrupt their nests.

After numerous tests about the mating system and generic structure of the bull ant Myrmecia pavida, Chappell wrote:

We find little evidence of geographic structuring or inbreeding in the population, indicating that the species outbreeds, most probably in mating swarms. We also find that queens of M. pavida show moderately high polyandry, with 84% having mated with between two and seven males, and an overall mean observed mating frequency of 3.8. This is significantly higher than previously reported for queens of Nothomyrmecia macrops, in which most females mate singly. This was similar to that of Myrmecia pyriformis, Myrmecia brevinoda, and Myrmecia pilosula, the three congenerics for which mating frequencies have recently been reported.

— Chappell, P,
