= Myrmecia midas =

Scientific classification
- Kingdom: Animalia
- Phylum: Arthropoda
- Class: Insecta
- Order: Hymenoptera
- Family: Formicidae
- Subfamily: Myrmeciinae
- Genus: Myrmecia
- Species: M. midas

Binomial name
- Myrmecia midas Clark, 1951

Species of ant

Myrmecia midas is an Australian ant which belongs to the genus Myrmecia. This species is native to Australia. Myrmecia midas is distributed mainly along the coastlines of several eastern Australian states. It was first described by John S. Clark in 1951.

Workers are typically 13-15 millimetres long, with the queens bigger at 18-19 millimetres and the males smaller. The head and thorax are red, the gaster black, and the mandibles, antennae, and the legs are brownish red.
