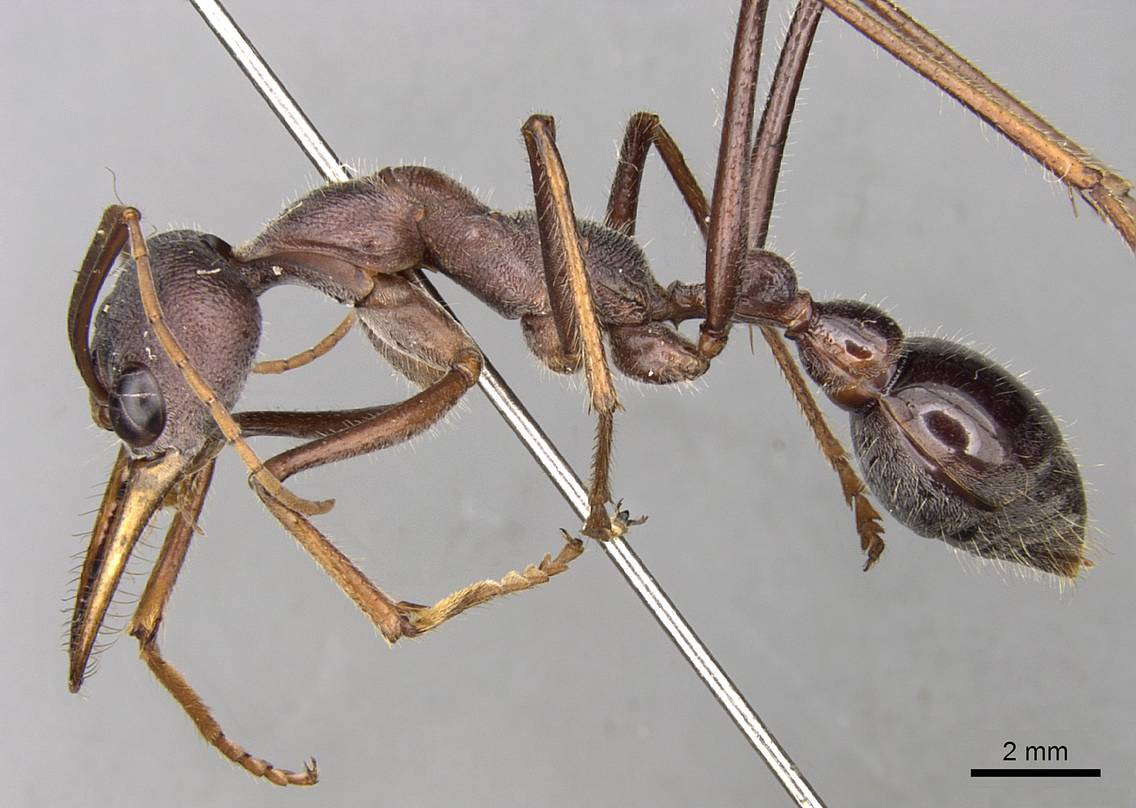
- Myrmecia forceps worker

Scientific classification
- Kingdom: Animalia
- Phylum: Arthropoda
- Class: Insecta
- Order: Hymenoptera
- Family: Formicidae
- Subfamily: Myrmeciinae
- Genus: Myrmecia
- Species: M. forceps

Binomial name
- Myrmecia forceps Roger, 1861

= Myrmecia forceps =

Species of ant

Myrmecia forceps is an Australian ant in the genus Myrmecia. This species is native to Australia and commonly distributed in most of the southern regions of Australia. They were described by Roger in 1861.

== Characteristics ==
M. forceps is a moderately big bull ant at 19-24 mm long. Queens are the biggest at 25 mm, while the males are smaller. Their heads and thoraces are brown, femora are in a lighter brown colour, mandibles, antennae, and several other features can be yellow or reddish yellow.

== Evolution ==
Myrmecia forceps is known to mimic dominant local species, resulting in regional colour variation. On Kangaroo Island, Myrmecia forceps mimics the colouration and patterning of M. rufinodis, a ubiquitous species in the region. This is likely an instance of Müllerian mimicry.

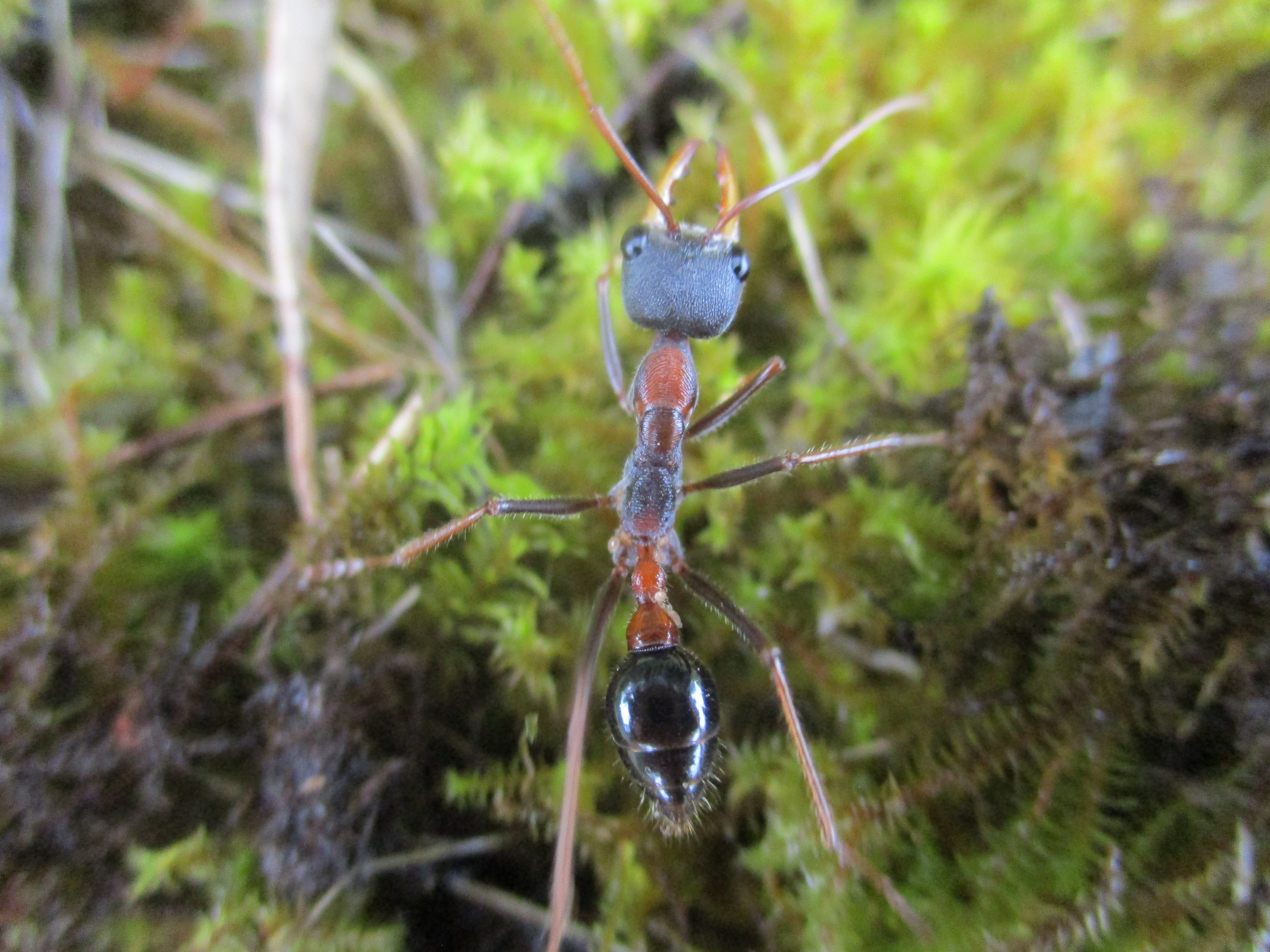
Myrmecia forceps worker
