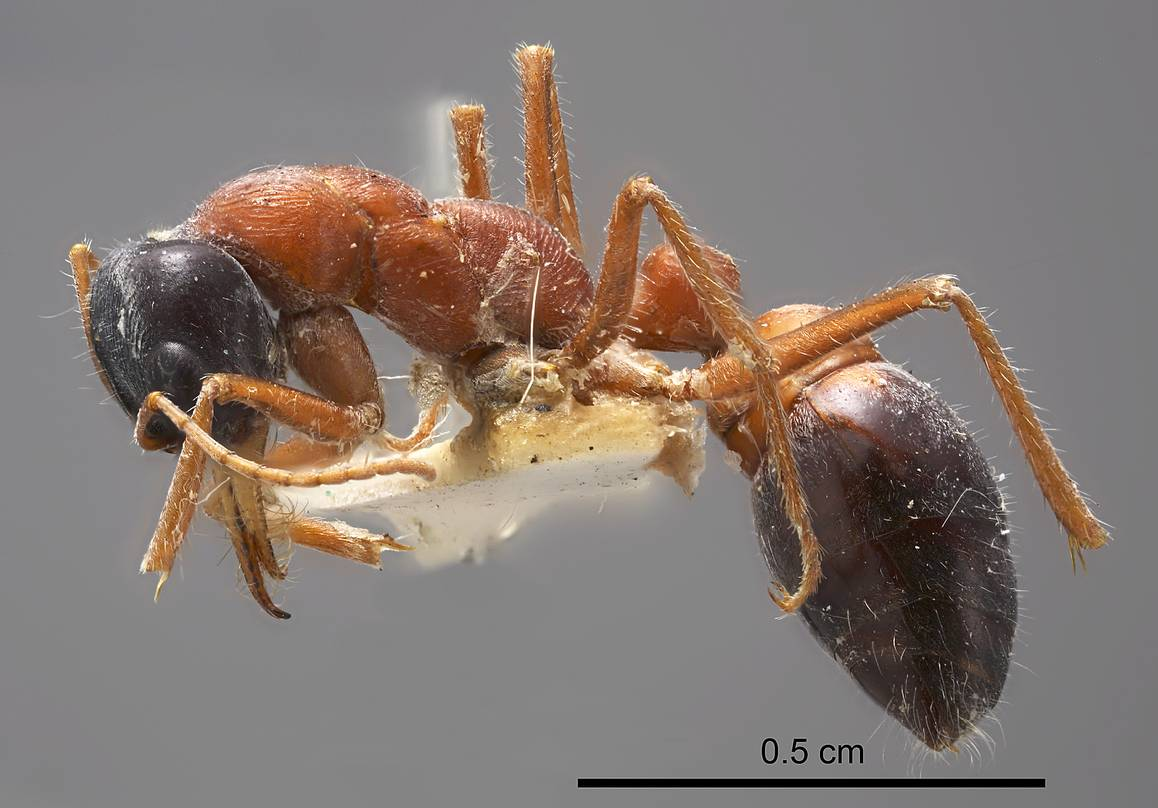
- Myrmecia cephalotes worker

Scientific classification
- Kingdom: Animalia
- Phylum: Arthropoda
- Clade: Pancrustacea
- Class: Insecta
- Order: Hymenoptera
- Family: Formicidae
- Subfamily: Myrmeciinae
- Genus: Myrmecia
- Species: M. cephalotes

Binomial name
- Myrmecia cephalotes Clark, 1943

= Myrmecia cephalotes =

Species of ant

Myrmecia cephalotes is an Australian ant which belongs to the genus Myrmecia. This species is native to Australia. Myrmecia cephalotes has a large distribution in central South Australia and can be found in other regions of Australia.

The length of a worker Myrmecia cephalotes is 13–14.5 millimetres long. The head and gaster are black; the antennae, thorax, node, legs and other features on the body are a yellowish-red colour. The mandibles are a yellow colour.
