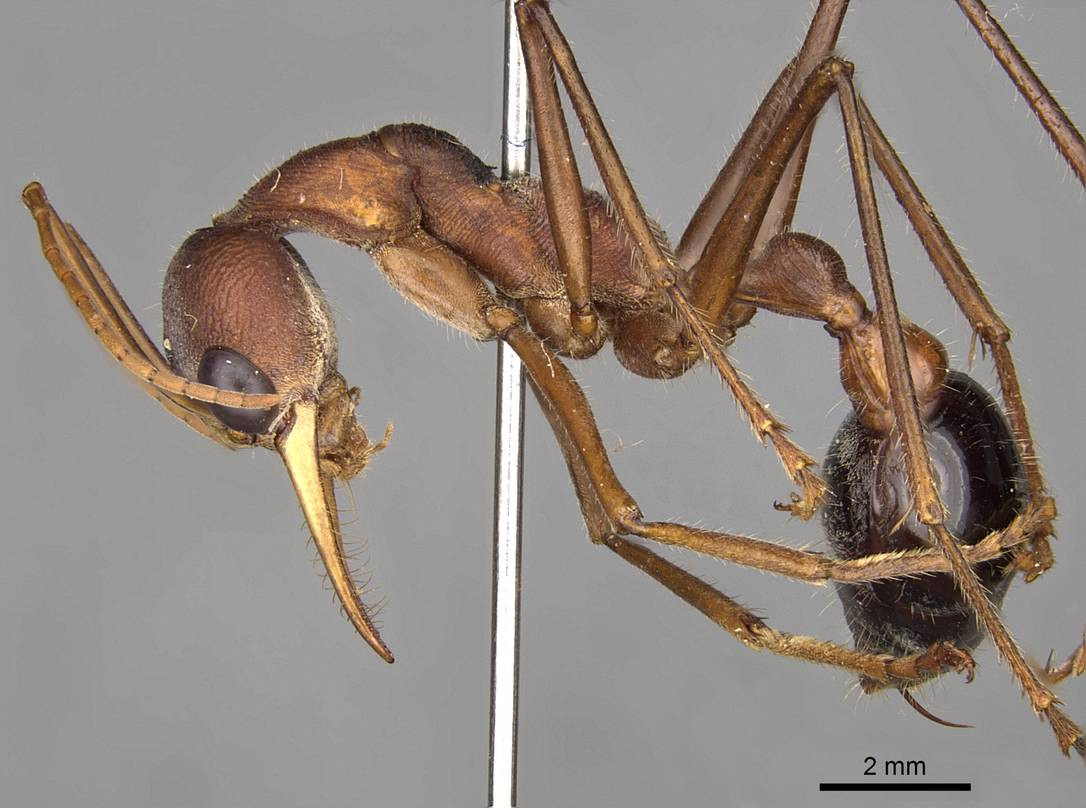
- Myrmecia gratiosa worker

Scientific classification
- Kingdom: Animalia
- Phylum: Arthropoda
- Class: Insecta
- Order: Hymenoptera
- Family: Formicidae
- Subfamily: Myrmeciinae
- Genus: Myrmecia
- Species: M. gratiosa

Binomial name
- Myrmecia gratiosa Clark, 1951

= Myrmecia gratiosa =

Species of ant endemic to Australia

Myrmecia gratiosa is an Australian ant which belongs to the genus Myrmecia. Native to Australia, this species is mainly found in Western Australia. During a study in Perth, it was realised that Myrmecia gratiosa was located in all locations where reactions in patients occurred. This concludes the species was responsible for ant sting anaphylaxis around Perth.

== Appearance ==
Worker ants of Myrmecia gratiosa are 21-23 millimetres long. Queens are larger while the drones (males) are slightly smaller. Myrmecia gratiosa's head, antennae, thorax, and legs are in a reddish yellow colour. Their mandibles are in a pale yellow colour while the gaster is black.
