= Myrmecia ferruginea =

Scientific classification
- Kingdom: Animalia
- Phylum: Arthropoda
- Class: Insecta
- Order: Hymenoptera
- Family: Formicidae
- Subfamily: Myrmeciinae
- Genus: Myrmecia
- Species: M. ferruginea

Binomial name
- Myrmecia ferruginea Mayr, 1876

Species of ant endemic to Australia

Myrmecia ferruginea is an Australian ant which belongs to the genus Myrmecia. This species is native to Australia. The Myrmecia ferrguinea has been notably distributed in Queensland.

Being described in 1876 by Mayr, the Myrmecia ferruginea has a similar identity to the M. nigriceps. The appearance of the Myrmecia ferruginea is mostly a reddish like colour. It was once assumed to be a colour variant of the M. nigriceps as well.
