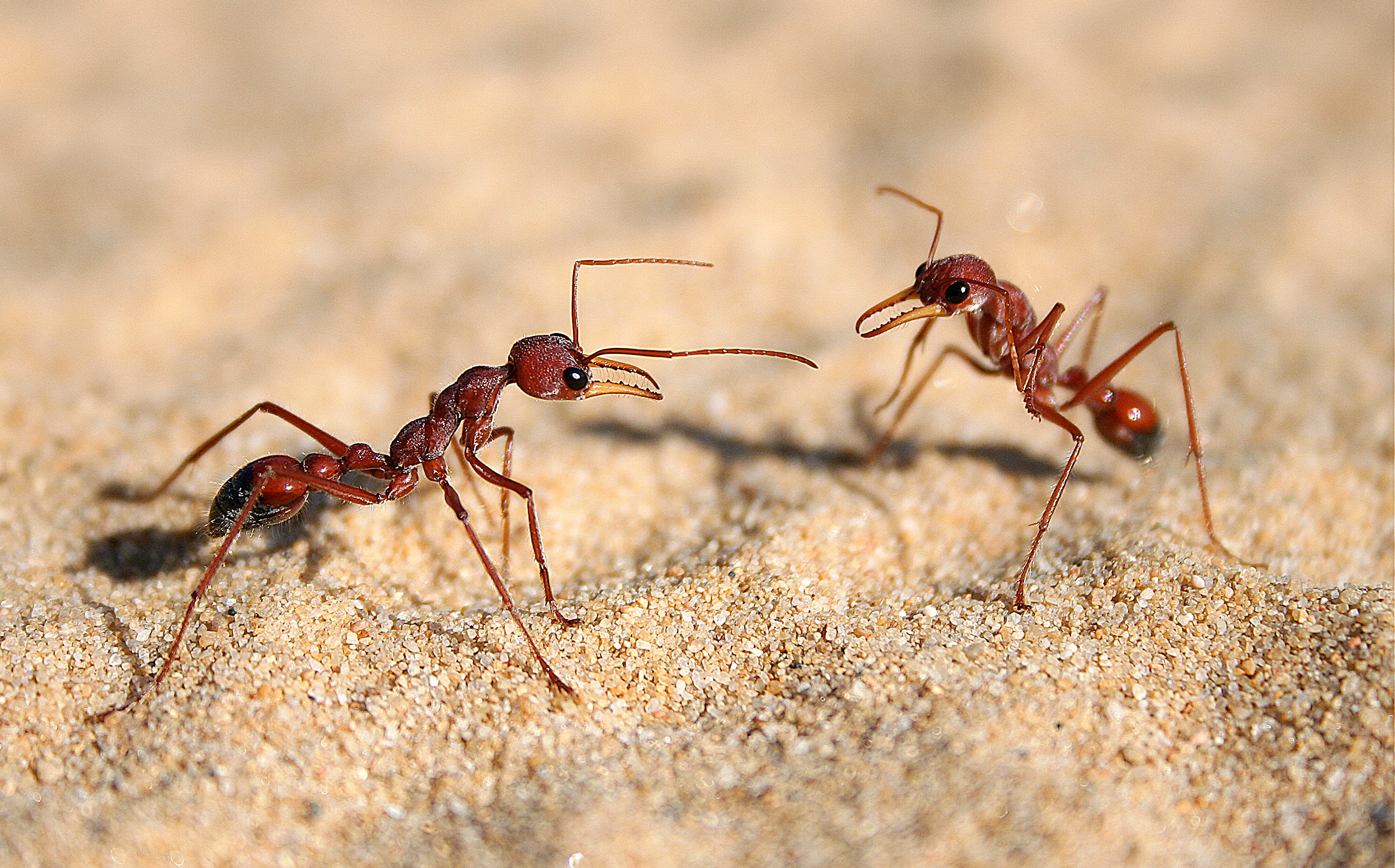
- In Sydney, Australia

Scientific classification
- Kingdom: Animalia
- Phylum: Arthropoda
- Class: Insecta
- Order: Hymenoptera
- Family: Formicidae
- Subfamily: Myrmeciinae
- Genus: Myrmecia
- Species: M. nigriscapa

Binomial name
- Myrmecia nigriscapa Roger, 1861

= Myrmecia nigriscapa =

Species of ant endemic to Australia

Myrmecia nigriscapa is an Australian ant in the genus Myrmecia. This species is native to Australia and is heavily distributed along the southern coastlines of Australia with some presence in the inner areas of Australia.

The average length of a worker is 17-25 mm long. The queens are bigger at 23-26 mm, and males generally only get to 16-20 mm in length. Its head, thorax, and node are red, the legs are a yellowish-red colour, and the mandibles and clypeus are a reddish-yellow colour.
