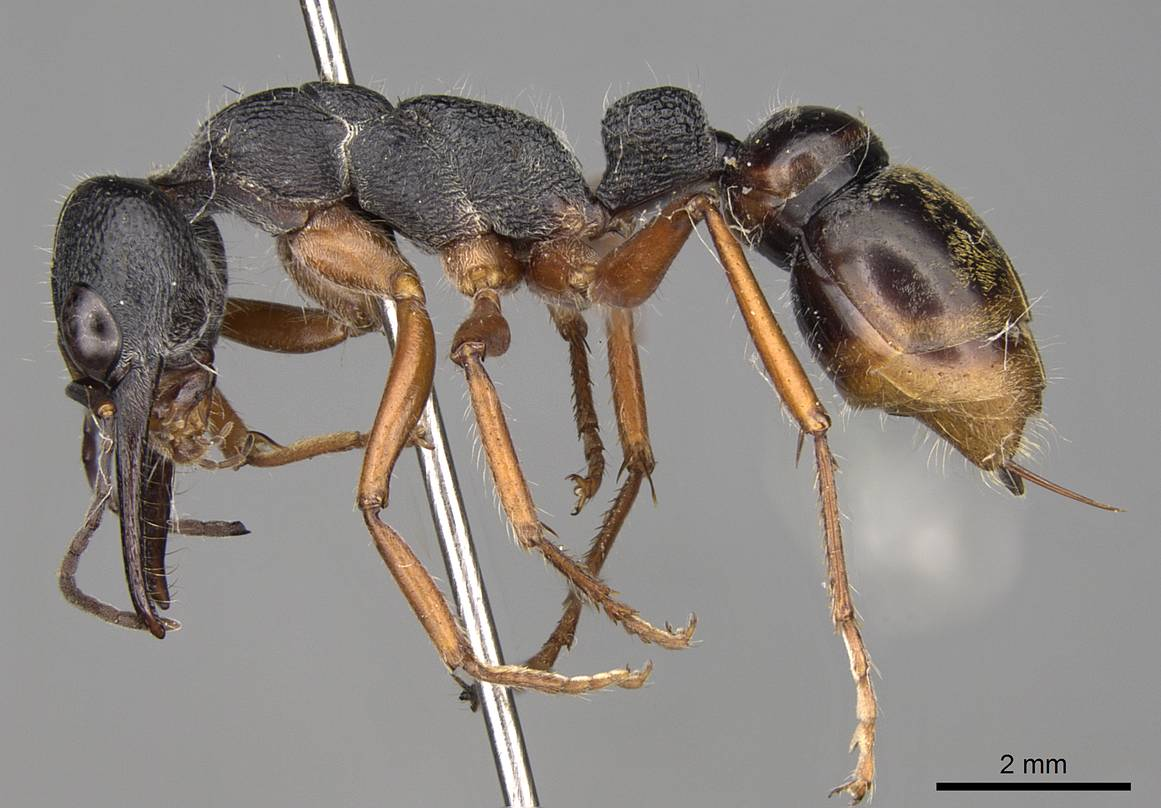

Scientific classification
- Kingdom: Animalia
- Phylum: Arthropoda
- Clade: Pancrustacea
- Class: Insecta
- Order: Hymenoptera
- Family: Formicidae
- Subfamily: Myrmeciinae
- Genus: Myrmecia
- Species: M. fulviculis

Binomial name
- Myrmecia fulviculis Forel, 1913

= Myrmecia fulviculis =

Species of ant

Myrmecia fulviculis, the toothless bullant, is an Australian ant which belongs to the genus Myrmecia. This species is native to Australia and is usually distributed along the coastlines of New South Wales and Queensland.

The species has a resemblance of the M. fulvipes. The average size is around 13–14.5 millimetres long. Queens are around 21 millimetres long and males are a similar size to the workers. The head, thorax, and node are a black colour, while the mandibles and antennae is reddish brown.
