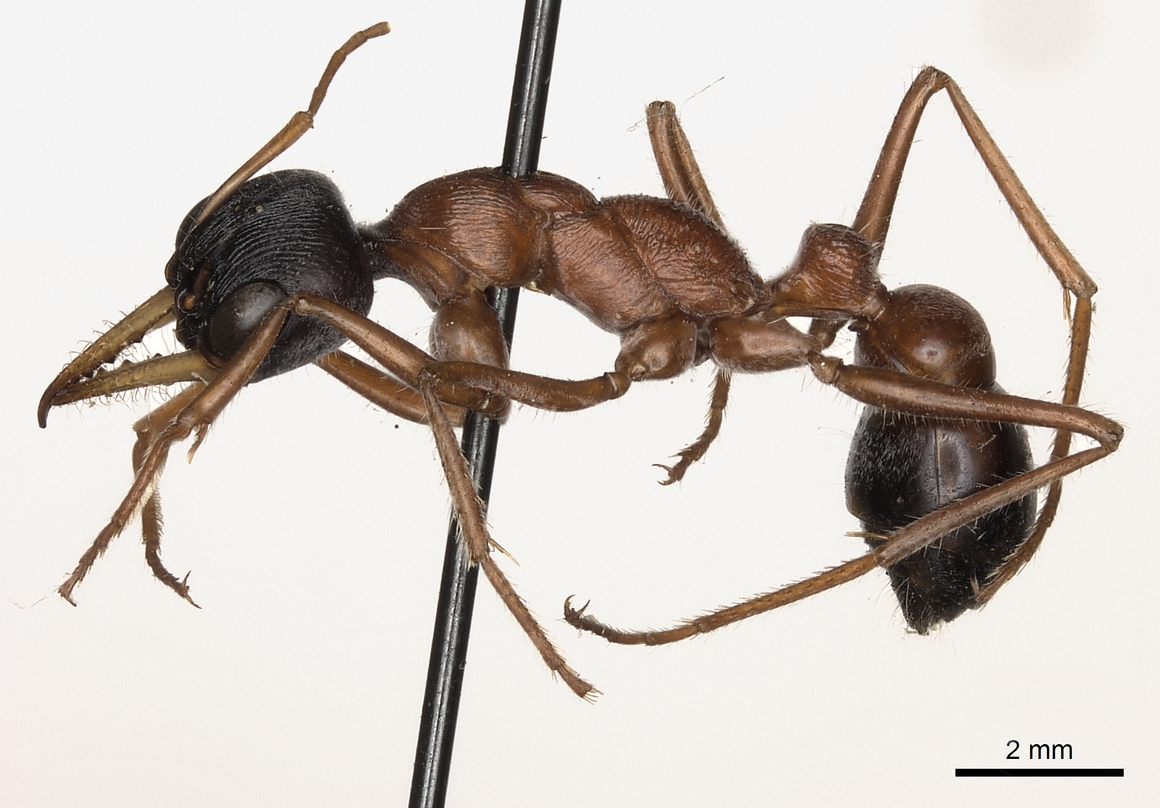

Scientific classification
- Kingdom: Animalia
- Phylum: Arthropoda
- Class: Insecta
- Order: Hymenoptera
- Family: Formicidae
- Subfamily: Myrmeciinae
- Genus: Myrmecia
- Species: M. hilli

Binomial name
- Myrmecia hilli Clark, 1943

= Myrmecia hilli =

Species of ant endemic to Australia

Myrmecia hilli is an ant species native to Australia. It belongs to the genus of Myrmecia, and described by John S. Clark in 1943. Specimens observed were mainly found in the Northern Territory.

The size of Myrmecia hilli species is around 14 millimetres. The head is coloured black, mandibles yellow, and antennae, legs, thorax, and most features are in a reddish yellow colour. The legs are also quite long.
