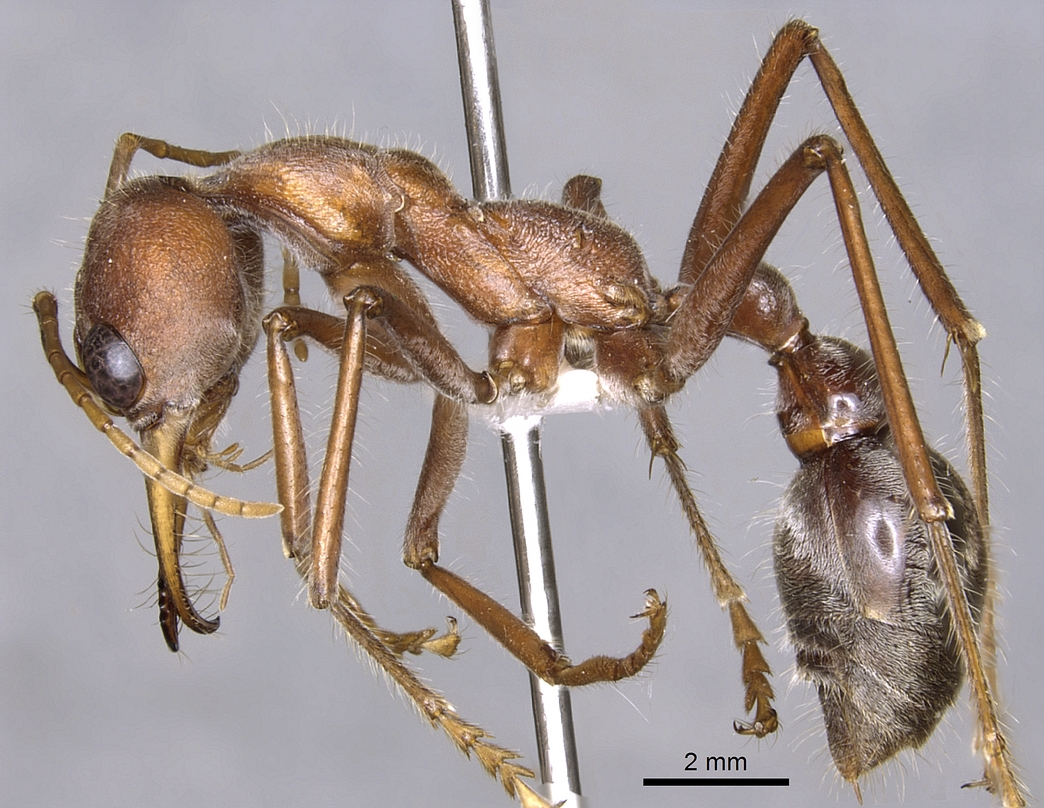

Scientific classification
- Kingdom: Animalia
- Phylum: Arthropoda
- Class: Insecta
- Order: Hymenoptera
- Family: Formicidae
- Subfamily: Myrmeciinae
- Genus: Myrmecia
- Species: M. tridentata

Binomial name
- Myrmecia tridentata Ogata & Taylor, 1991

= Myrmecia tridentata =

Species of ant endemic to Australia

Myrmecia tridentata is an Australian ant which belongs to the genus Myrmecia. It is native to Australia. They have been usually spotted in South Australia, Victoria, and Queensland. It was described by Kazuo Ogata and Robert Taylor in 1991.

Most of the colour on Myrmecia tridentata is a light brown colour. The abdomen however is a black colour, and the mandibles are of a yellow colour. Antennae and legs are exactly the same colour as most of the body.
