= Myrmecia subfasciata =

Scientific classification
- Kingdom: Animalia
- Phylum: Arthropoda
- Class: Insecta
- Order: Hymenoptera
- Family: Formicidae
- Subfamily: Myrmeciinae
- Genus: Myrmecia
- Species: M. subfasciata

Binomial name
- Myrmecia subfasciata Viehmeyer, 1924

Species of ant endemic to Australia

Myrmecia subfasciata is an ant which belongs to the genus Myrmecia. This species is endemic to Australia. Their distribution in Australia is not exactly known but a specimen was collected in Liverpool. It was described by Viehmeyer in 1924.

The average worker length is 21 millimetres long. The Myrmecia subfasciata has a very similar appearance to the Myrmecia gulosa and the Myrmecia pyriformis.
