= Myrmecia fucosa =

Scientific classification
- Kingdom: Animalia
- Phylum: Arthropoda
- Class: Insecta
- Order: Hymenoptera
- Family: Formicidae
- Subfamily: Myrmeciinae
- Genus: Myrmecia
- Species: M. fucosa

Binomial name
- Myrmecia fucosa Clark, 1934

Species of ant

Myrmecia fucosa is a species of ant in the genus Myrmecia. The first specimen of Myrmecia fucosa was described in 1934.

Myrmecia fucosa is mainly abundant in Victoria, and notably around Lake Hattah at the Hattah-Kulkyne National Park, which is not too far from Mildura.
