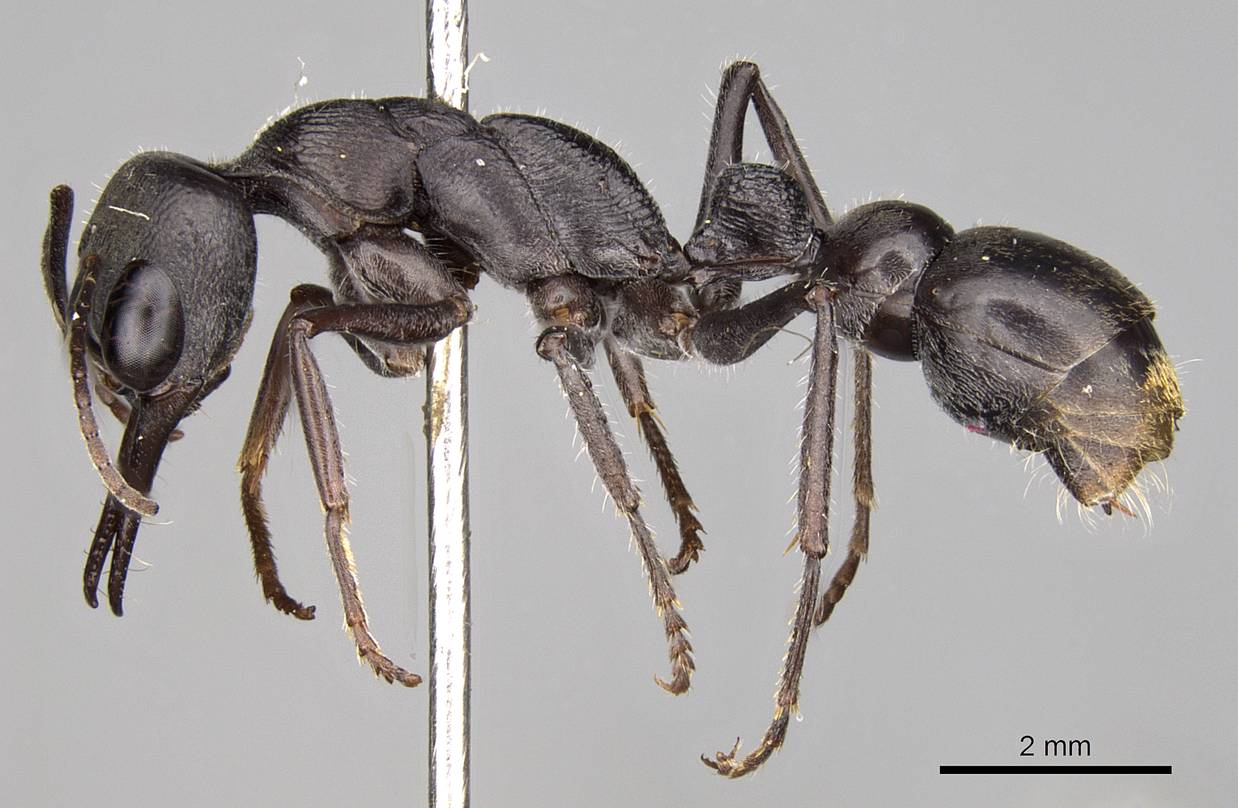
- M. tepperi worker

Scientific classification
- Kingdom: Animalia
- Phylum: Arthropoda
- Clade: Pancrustacea
- Class: Insecta
- Order: Hymenoptera
- Family: Formicidae
- Subfamily: Myrmeciinae
- Genus: Myrmecia
- Species: M. tepperi

Binomial name
- Myrmecia tepperi Emery, 1898

= Myrmecia tepperi =

Species of ant

Myrmecia tepperi is an Australian ant which belongs to the genus Myrmecia. This species is native to Australia. Their distribution is large in Western Australia, South Australia, and New South Wales.

Myrmecia tepperi is a small bull ant species at only 10.5–12 millimetres in length. Queens are the biggest at 14–15 millimetres, and males are slightly bigger than the workers at 12.5 millimetres. Most of the body is a blackish-brown colour. The mandibles, antennae, and legs are also a brownish like colour.
