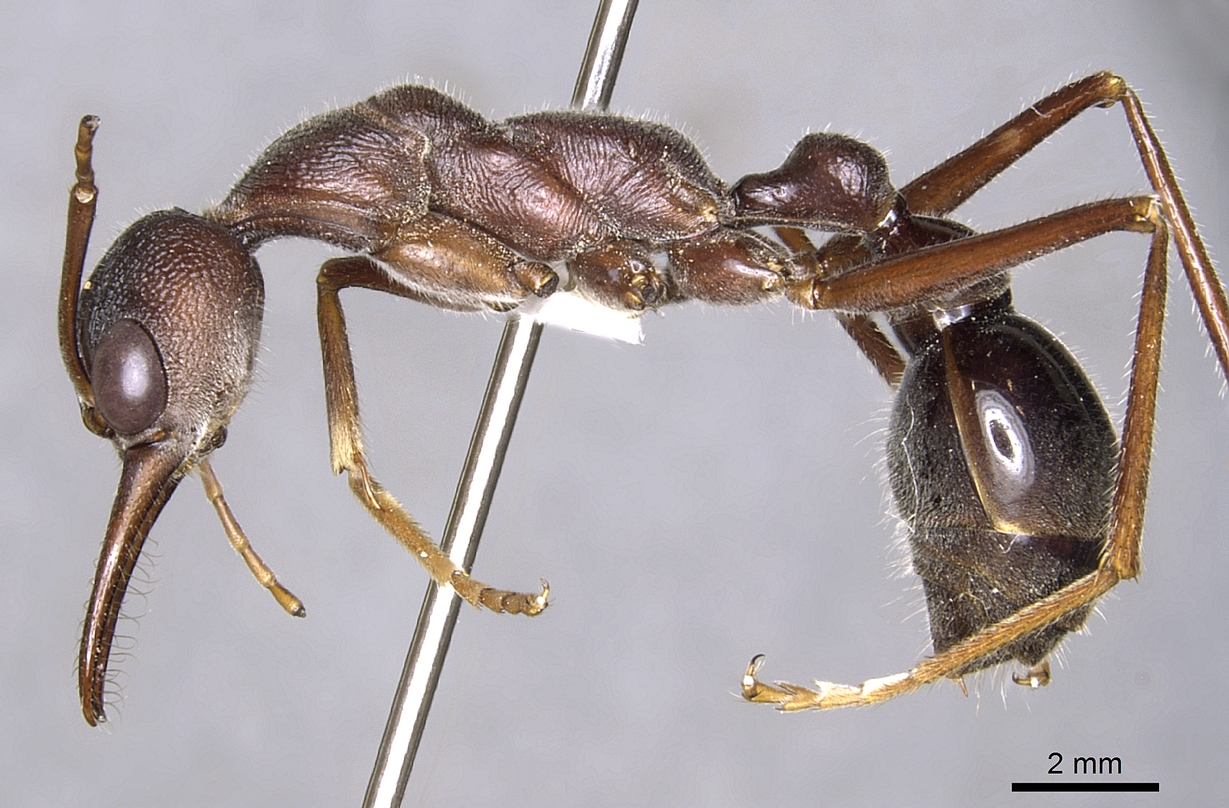

Scientific classification
- Kingdom: Animalia
- Phylum: Arthropoda
- Class: Insecta
- Order: Hymenoptera
- Family: Formicidae
- Subfamily: Myrmeciinae
- Genus: Myrmecia
- Species: M. erecta

Binomial name
- Myrmecia erecta Ogata & Taylor, 1991

= Myrmecia erecta =

Species of ant endemic to Australia

Myrmecia erecta is an Australian bull ant species, a part of the genus Myrmecia. They are endemic to Australia. They are mainly distributed in South Australia and the surrounding areas of the state.

Most of the body of the species is a brown colour. However, the mandibles, legs and antennae are of a lighter shade of brown. The thorax of the Myrmecia erecta is a black colour. They are slightly similar to the Jack jumper ant.
