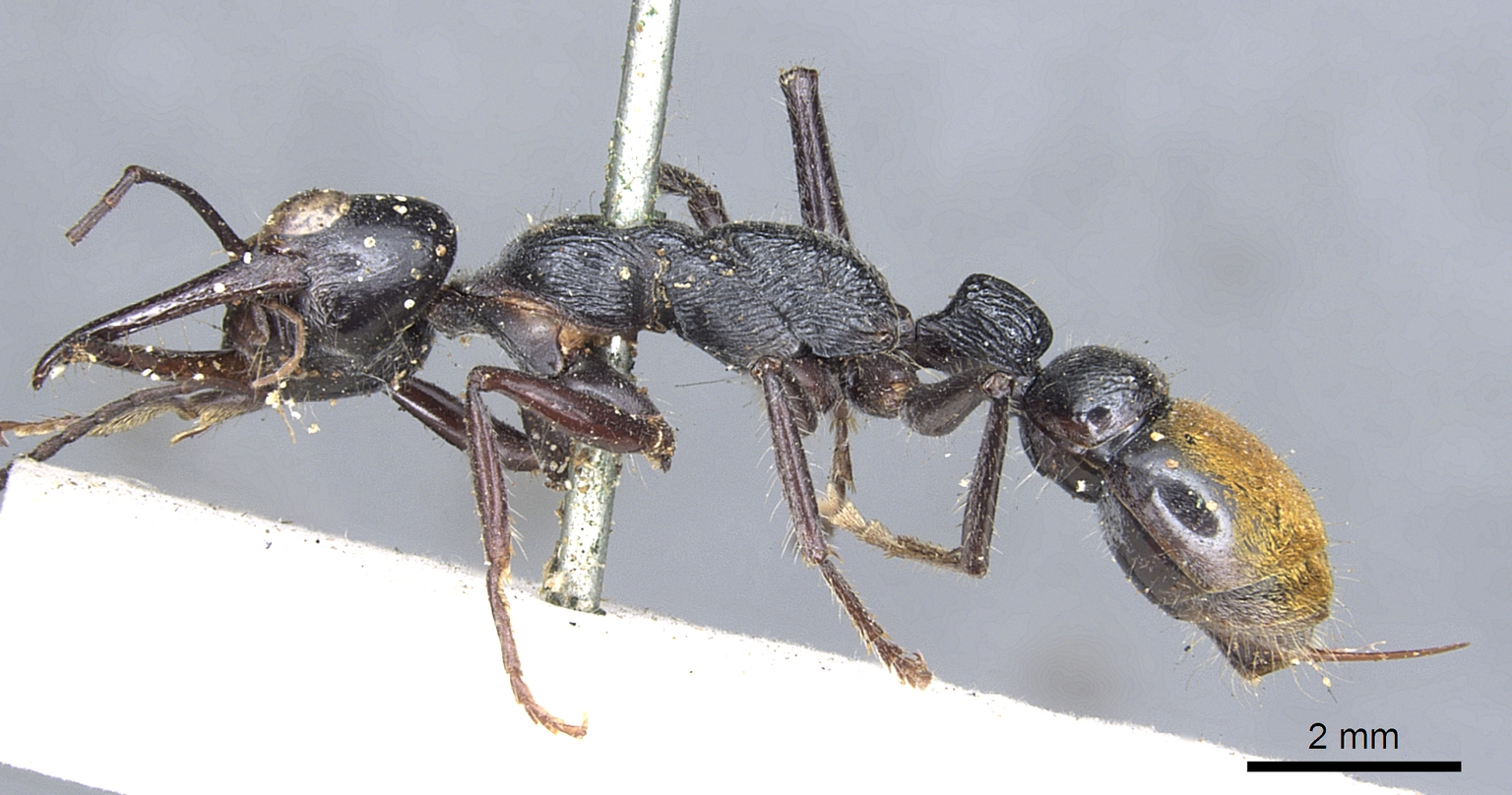
- Myrmecia mandibularis worker

Scientific classification
- Kingdom: Animalia
- Phylum: Arthropoda
- Class: Insecta
- Order: Hymenoptera
- Family: Formicidae
- Subfamily: Myrmeciinae
- Genus: Myrmecia
- Species: M. mandibularis

Binomial name
- Myrmecia mandibularis Smith, 1858

= Myrmecia mandibularis =

Species of ant

Myrmecia mandibularis is an Australian species of Myrmecia. Average sizes for the Myrmecia mandibularis is around 15–30 millimetres. They have a similar appearance to the Myrmecia pilosula, except their mandibles are completely black while most of their abdomen is in an orange colour.

Described in 1858, the species is mainly found in the southern regions of Australia, and most frequently seen around Perth.
