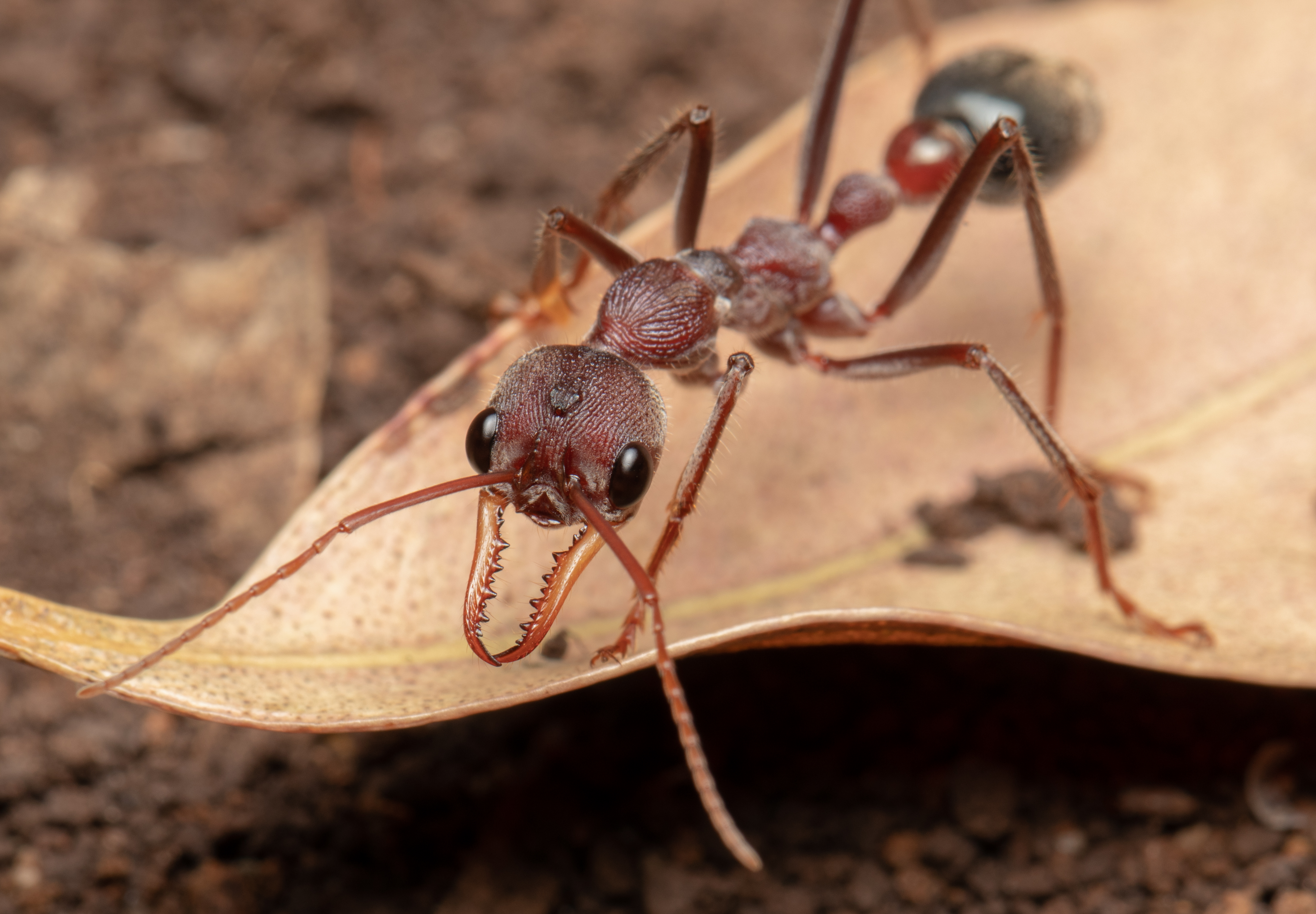
- Myrmecia flavicoma, Bunya Mountains National Park

Scientific classification
- Kingdom: Animalia
- Phylum: Arthropoda
- Class: Insecta
- Order: Hymenoptera
- Family: Formicidae
- Subfamily: Myrmeciinae
- Genus: Myrmecia
- Species: M. flavicoma

Binomial name
- Myrmecia flavicoma Roger, 1861

= Myrmecia flavicoma =

Species of ant

Myrmecia flavicoma is an ant species native to Australia. This species is a member of the genus Myrmecia. It was first described in 1861 by Julius Roger. Myrmecia flavicoma is found in Queensland and some areas of New South Wales.

== Description ==
The size of the Myrmecia flavicoma is 21-22 millimetres long. Head, thorax, node, and extra features are in a red colour and the mandibles are yellow. Some other features of the Myrmecia flavicoma are black, like the antennae's and legs.
