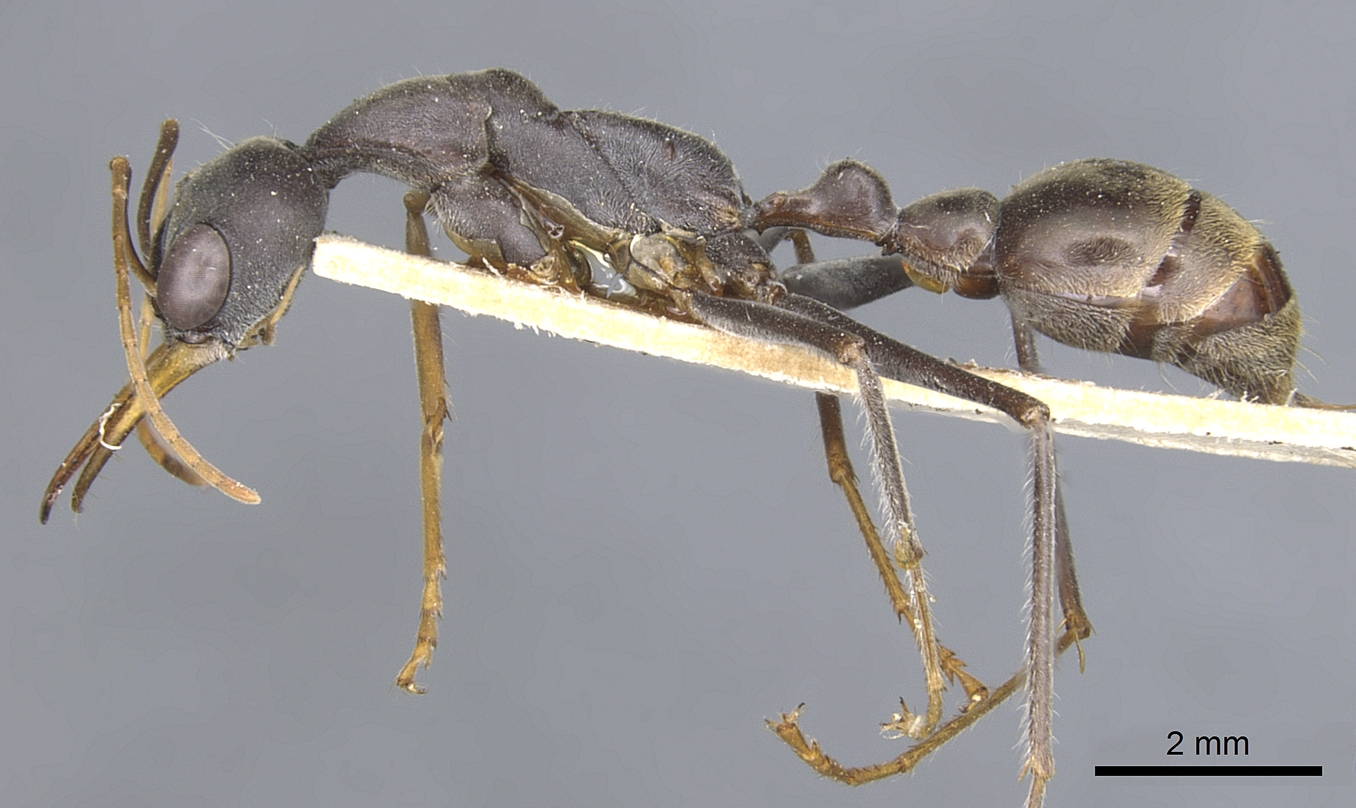

Scientific classification
- Kingdom: Animalia
- Phylum: Arthropoda
- Class: Insecta
- Order: Hymenoptera
- Family: Formicidae
- Subfamily: Myrmeciinae
- Genus: Myrmecia
- Species: M. petiolata

Binomial name
- Myrmecia petiolata Emery, 1895

= Myrmecia petiolata =

Species of ant

Myrmecia petiolata is an Australian ant which belongs to the genus Myrmecia. This species is native to Australia. This species has mainly been observed and distributed in the north of Queensland. It was first described by Carlo Emery in 1895.

Average length for a typical worker ant is 11-13 millimetres long. It is mainly a blackish-brown colour. Mandibles, tarsi, and other features are yellow, scapes and anterior and several other features is a yellowish brown. Head and thorax is blackish-brown.
