= Myrmecia maura =

Scientific classification
- Kingdom: Animalia
- Phylum: Arthropoda
- Class: Insecta
- Order: Hymenoptera
- Family: Formicidae
- Subfamily: Myrmeciinae
- Genus: Myrmecia
- Species: M. maura

Binomial name
- Myrmecia maura Wheeler, 1933

Species of ant

Myrmecia maura is an Australian ant which belongs to the genus Myrmecia. This species is native to Australia. Their distribution in Australia is mostly around the Australian Capital Territory and New South Wales.

The average length of a worker Myrmecia maura is 11-13 millimetres in length. The queens are normally larger at 14-16 millimetres in length. The mandibles are notably smaller than most species. It is mostly black, and the mandibles, antennae, and tarsi are a reddish yellow colour. The teeth on the mandibles are different however which is a blackish-brown colour, and parts of the legs are a reddish brown.
