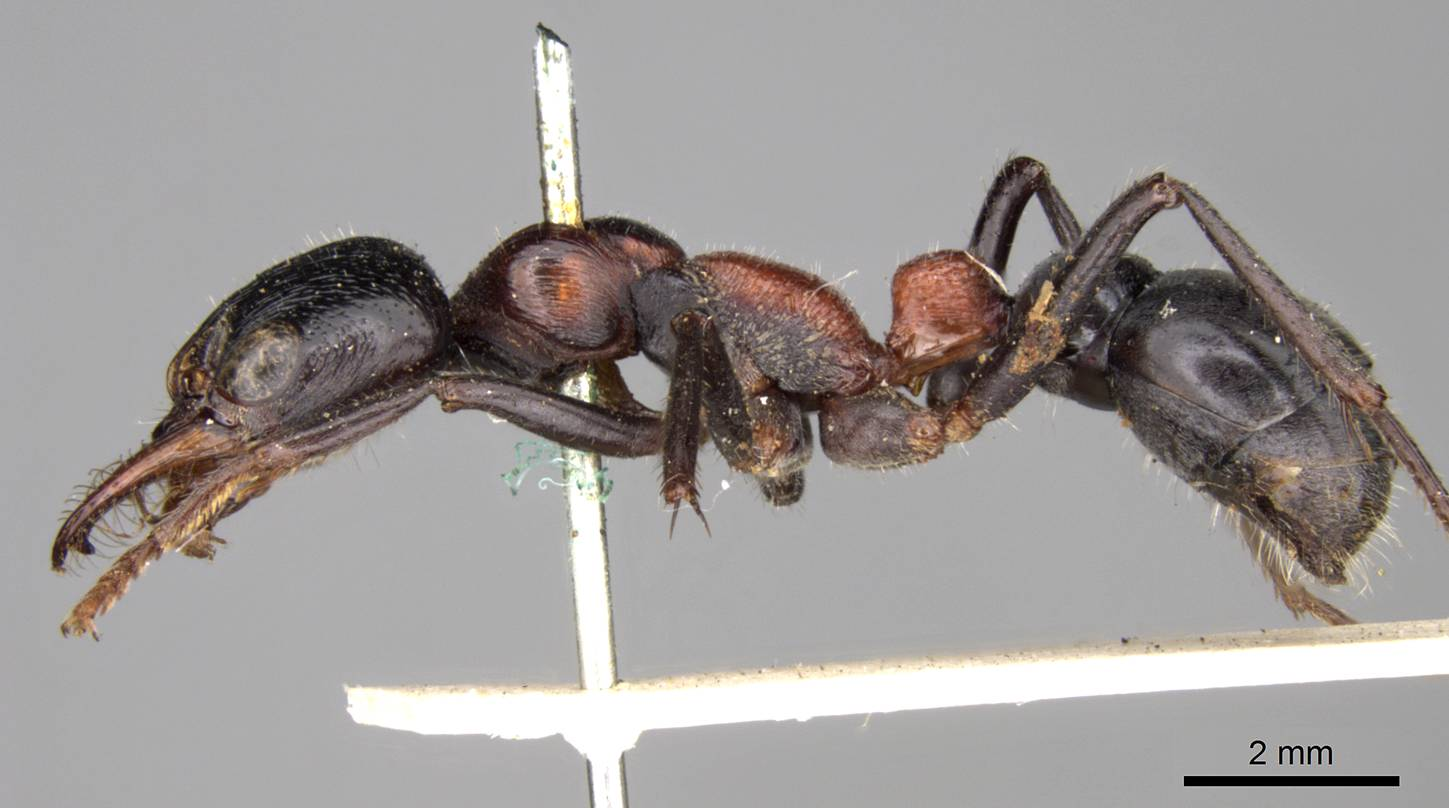
- M. aberrans worker

Scientific classification
- Kingdom: Animalia
- Phylum: Arthropoda
- Class: Insecta
- Order: Hymenoptera
- Family: Formicidae
- Subfamily: Myrmeciinae
- Genus: Myrmecia
- Species: M. aberrans

Binomial name
- Myrmecia aberrans Forel, 1900

= Myrmecia aberrans =

Species of ant endemic to Australia

Myrmecia aberrans is an Australian bull ant of the genus Myrmecia. It is mostly spotted in South Australia and the states surroundings. The species of the bull ant was first described in 1900. The average length is around 12 millimetres. M. aberrans ants are commonly known as "wide jawed bull ants".

The species of this bull ant all tend to be in very dark colours, but is quite distinct in comparison to other darker Myrmecia species.

== Distribution ==
Main observations of M. aberrans is only around South Australia. No specimen of the species has been recorded outside of South Australia.
