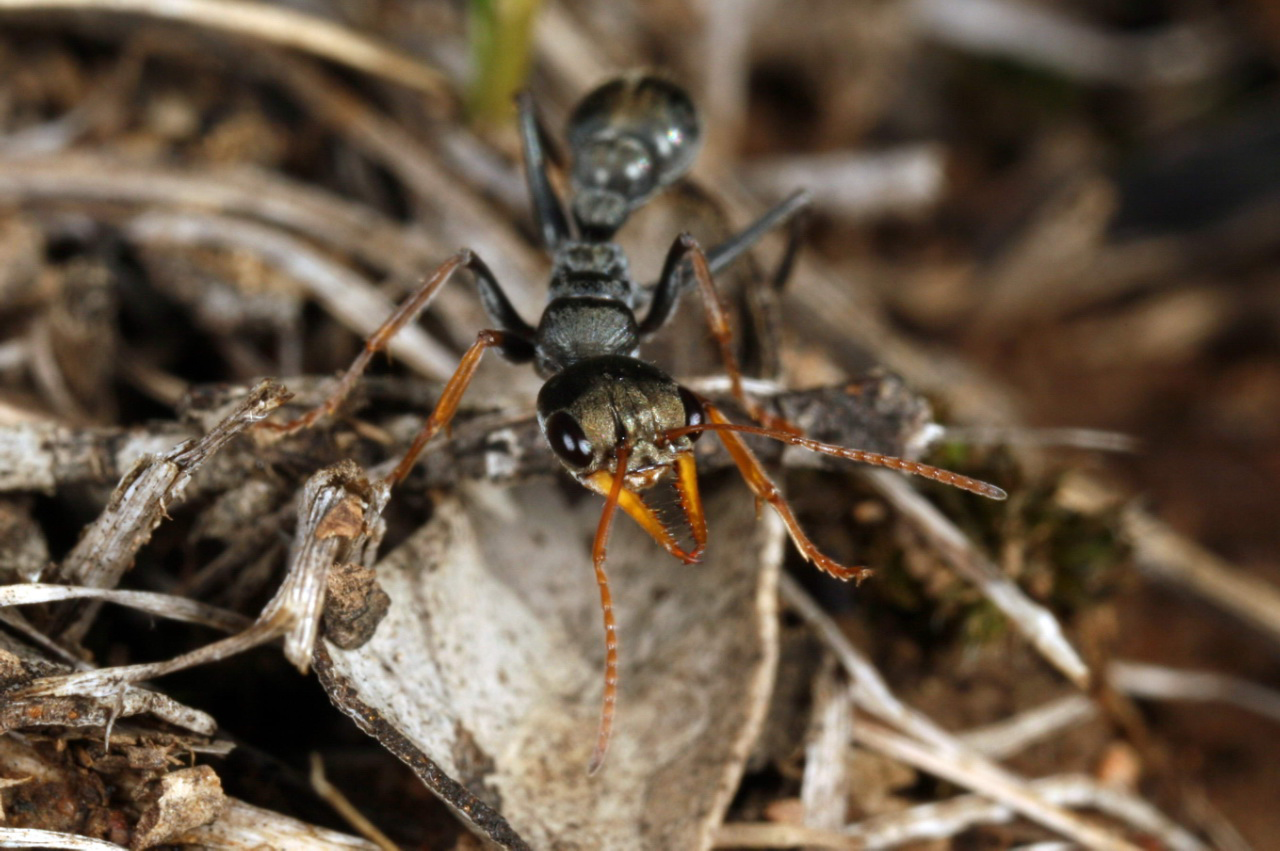
- Worker ant

Scientific classification
- Kingdom: Animalia
- Phylum: Arthropoda
- Clade: Pancrustacea
- Class: Insecta
- Order: Hymenoptera
- Family: Formicidae
- Subfamily: Myrmeciinae
- Genus: Myrmecia
- Species: M. pilosula

Binomial name
- Myrmecia pilosula F. Smith, 1858
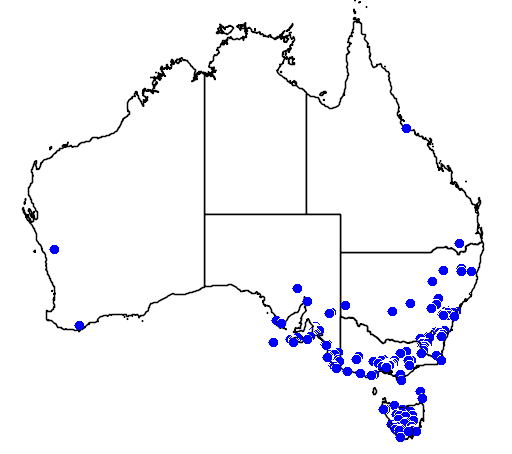
- Occurrences of the jack jumper ant reported to the Atlas of Living Australia as of May 2015

Synonyms
- Halmamyrmecia pilosula Wheeler, 1922; Myrmecia ruginoda F. Smith, 1858; Ponera ruginoda F. Smith, 1858; Promyrmecia pilosula Clark, 1943

= Jack jumper ant =

Species of ant endemic to Australia

The jack jumper ant (Myrmecia pilosula), also known as the jack jumper, jumping jack, hopper ant, or jumper ant, is a species of venomous ant native to Australia. Most frequently found in Tasmania and southeast mainland Australia, it is a member of the genus Myrmecia, subfamily Myrmeciinae, and was formally described and named by British entomologist Frederick Smith in 1858. This species is known for its ability to jump long distances. These ants are large; workers and males are about the same size: 12 to 14 mm (0.47 to 0.55 in) for workers, and 11 to 12 mm (0.43 to 0.47 in) for males. The queen measures roughly 14 to 16 mm (0.55 to 0.63 in) long and is similar in appearance to workers, whereas males are identifiable by their perceptibly smaller mandibles.

Jack jumper ants are primarily active during the day and live in open habitats, nesting in bushland, woodlands, and dry open forests, surrounded by gravel and sandy soil, which can be found in rural areas and are less common in urban areas. They prey on small insects and use their barbless stingers to kill other insects by injecting venom. Other ants and predatory invertebrates prey on the jack jumper ant. The average worker has a life expectancy of over one year. Workers are gamergates, allowing them to reproduce with drones, whether or not a queen is present in the colony. The ant is a part of the Myrmecia pilosula species complex; this ant and other members of the complex are known to have a single pair of chromosomes.

Their sting generally only causes a mild local reaction in humans; however, it is one of the few ant species that can be dangerous to humans, along with other ants in the genus Myrmecia. The ant venom is particularly immunogenic for an insect venom; the venom causes about 90% of Australian ant allergies. In endemic areas, up to 3% of the human population has developed an allergy to the venom and about half of these allergic people can suffer from anaphylactic reactions (increased heart rate, falling blood pressure, and other symptoms), which can lead to death on rare occasions. Between 1980 and 2000, four deaths were due to anaphylaxis from jack jumper stings, all of them in Tasmania. Individuals prone to severe allergic reactions caused by the ant's sting can be treated with allergen immunotherapy (desensitisation).

== Taxonomy and common names ==
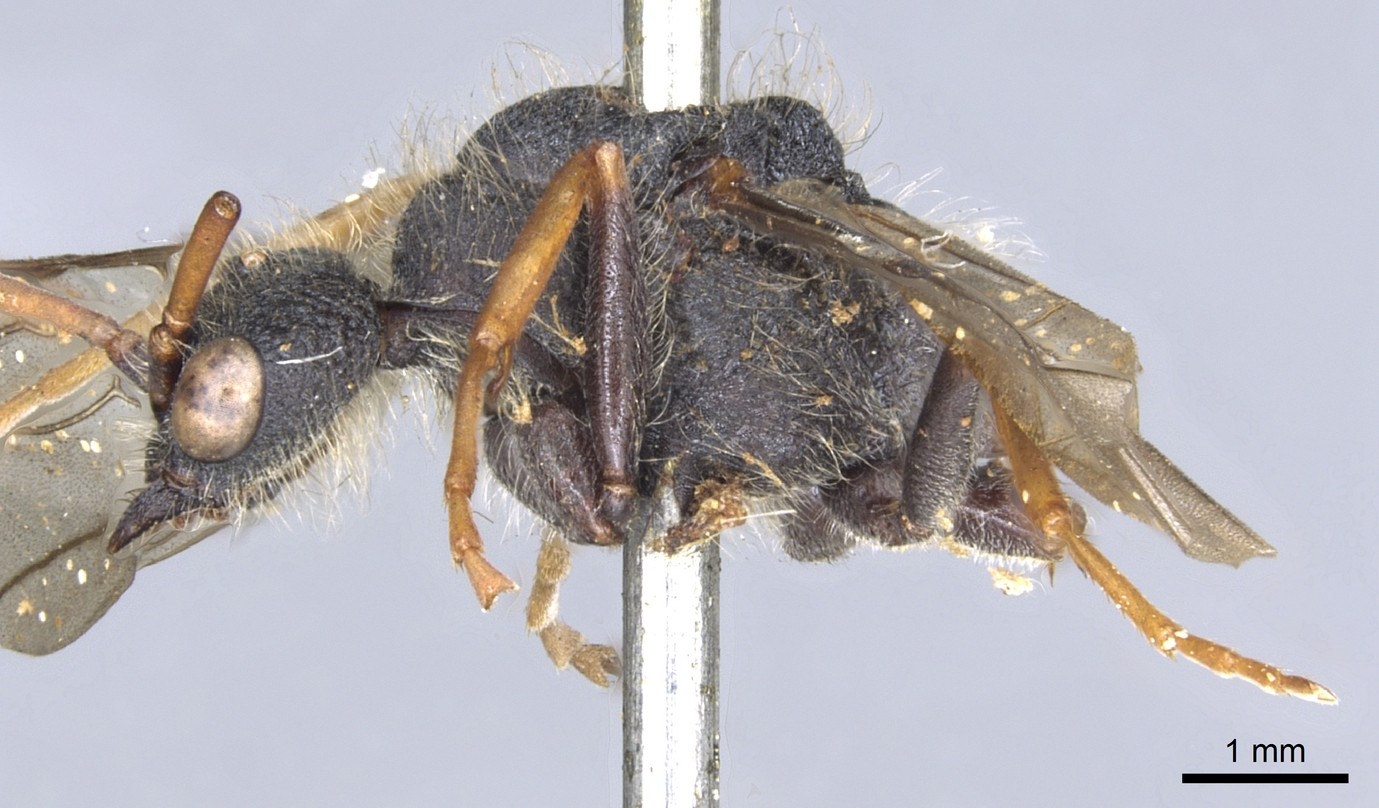
Original holotype specimen (abdomen missing) Ponera ruginoda

The specific name derives from the Latin word pilosa, meaning 'covered with soft hair'. The ant was first identified in 1858 by British entomologist Frederick Smith in his Catalogue of hymenopterous insects in the collection of the British Museum part VI, under the binomial name Myrmecia pilosula from specimens he collected in Hobart in Tasmania. There, Smith described the specimens of a worker, queen, and male. The type specimen is located in the British Museum in London. In 1922, American entomologist William Morton Wheeler established the subgenus Halmamyrmecia characterised by its jumping behaviour, of which the jack jumper ant was designated as the type species. However, John Clark later synonymised Halmamyrmecia under the subgenus Promyrmecia in 1927 and placed the ant in the subgenus in 1943. William Brown synonymised Promyrmecia due to the lack of morphological evidence that would make it distinct from Myrmecia and later placed the jack jumper ant in the genus in 1953.

One synonym for the species has been published – Ponera ruginoda (also titled Myrmecia ruginoda), described by Smith in the same work, and a male holotype specimen was originally described for this synonym. P. ruginoda was initially placed into the genera Ectatomma and Rhytidoponera, but it was later classified as a junior synonym of the jack jumper ant, after specimens of each were compared. The M. pilosula species complex was first defined by Italian entomologist Carlo Emery. The species complex is a monophyletic group, where the species are closely related to each other, but their actual genetic relationship is distant. Members of this group include M. apicalis, M. chasei, M. chrysogaster, M. croslandi, M. cydista, M. dispar, M. elegans, M. harderi, M. ludlowi, M. michaelseni, M. occidentalis M. queenslandica, M. rugosa, and M. varians. Additional species that were described in this group in 2015 include M. banksi, M. haskinsorum, M. imaii, and M. impaternata.

Their characteristic jumping motion when agitated or foraging inspires the common name "jack jumper", a behaviour also shared with other Myrmecia ants, such as M. nigrocincta. This is the most common name for the ant, along with "black jumper," "hopper ant", "jumper ant", "jumping ant", "jumping jack" and "skipper ant". It is also named after the jumping-jack firecracker. The species is a member of the genus Myrmecia, a part of the subfamily Myrmeciinae.

== Description ==
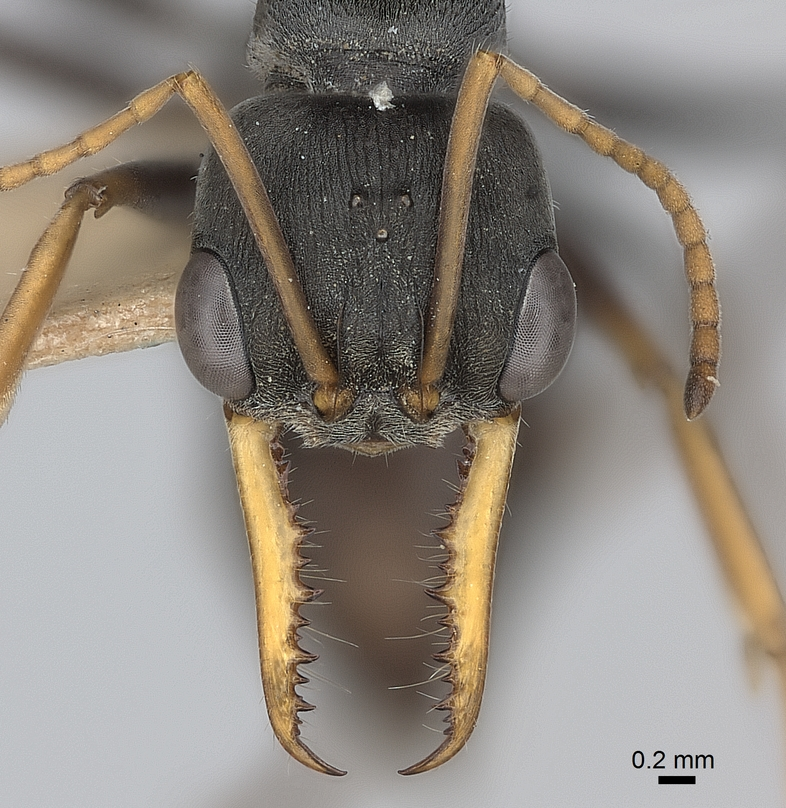
Close-up view of a specimen: These ants attack with both mandibles and stingers.

Like its relatives, the ant possesses a powerful sting and large mandibles. These ants can be black or blackish-red in colour, and may have yellow or orange legs. The ant is medium-sized in comparison to other Myrmecia species, where workers are typically 12 to 14 mm (0.47 to 0.55 in) long. Excluding mandibles, jack jumpers measure 10 millimetres (0.39 in) in length. The ant's antennae, tibiae, tarsi, and mandibles are also yellow or orange. Pubescence (hair) on the ant is greyish, short and erect, and is longer and more abundant on their gaster, absent on their antennae, and short and suberect on their legs. The pubescence on the male is grey and long, and abundant throughout the ant's body, but it shortens on the legs. The mandibles are long and slender (measuring 4.2 mm (0.17 in)), and concave around the outer border.

The queen has a similar appearance to the workers, but her middle body is more irregular and coarser. The queen is also the largest, measuring 14 to 16 mm (0.55 to 0.63 in) in length. Males are either smaller or around the same size as workers, measuring 11 to 12 mm (0.43 to 0.47 in). Males also have much smaller, triangular mandibles than workers and queens. The mandibles on the male contain a large tooth at the centre, among the apex and the base of the inner border. Punctures (tiny dots) are noticeable on the head, which are large and shallow, and the thorax and node are also irregularly punctuated. The pubescence on the male's gaster is white and yellowish.

== Distribution and habitat ==
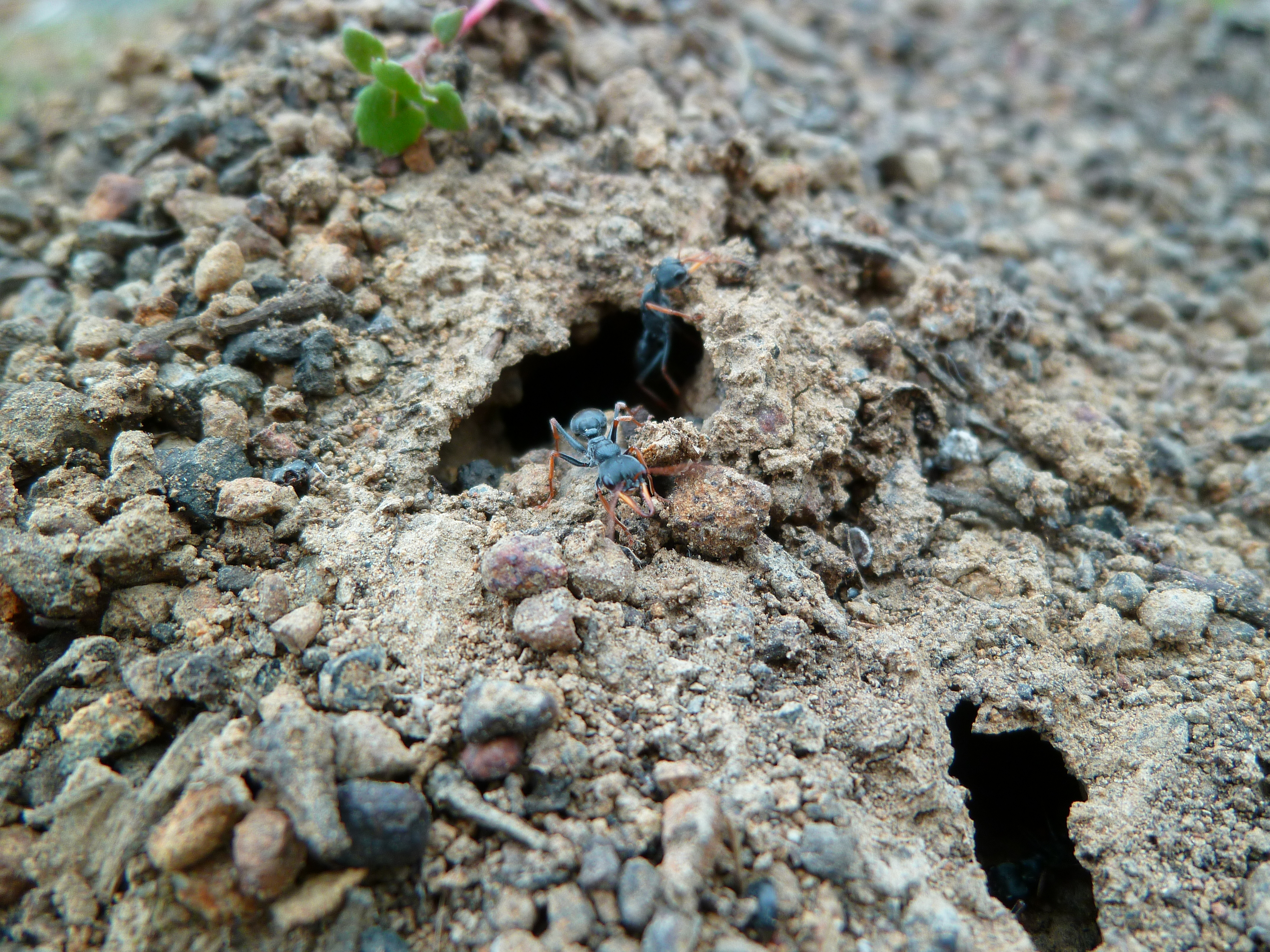
Two workers stand guard in front of the entrance to their nest

Jack jumper ants are abundant in most of Australia, being among the most common bull ant to be encountered. The ants can be found in the south-western tip of Western Australia, where it has been seen in the sand hills around Albany, Mundaring, Denmark and Esperance. The ant is rarely sighted in the northern regions of Western Australia. In South Australia, it is commonly found in the south-east regions of the state, frequently encountered in Mount Lofty (particularly the Adelaide Hills), Normanville, Hallett Cove and Aldgate, but it is not found in north-western regions. There are dense populations on the western seaboard of Kangaroo Island. Jack jumpers are widespread throughout the whole of Victoria, but the species is uncommon in Melbourne. However, populations have been collected from the suburb of Elsternwick, and they are commonly found in the Great Otway Ranges, with many nests observed around Gellibrand. In New South Wales, nests are found throughout the entire state (with the exception of north-western New South Wales), but dense populations are mostly found in the Snowy Mountains, Blue Mountains and coastal regions. The ants are widespread in the Australian Capital Territory. In Queensland, the ants are only found along the south-eastern coastlines of the state, where populations are frequently encountered in the Bunya Mountains, Fletcher, Stanthorpe, Sunshine Coast, Tamborine Mountain and Millmerran, and have been found as far north as Atherton Tablelands. (Note: Despite evidence of their presence in Queensland, CSIRO claim their presence in Queensland is yet to be verified.) The ant also resides in all of Tasmania, and their presence in the Northern Territory has not been verified.

Jack jumper ants live in open habitats, such as damp areas, forests, pastures, gardens, and lawns, preferring fine gravel and sandy soil. Colonies can also be spotted around light bushland. Their preferred natural habitats include woodlands, dry open forests, grasslands, and rural areas, and less common in urban areas. Their nests are mounds built from finely granular gravel, soil, and pebbles, measuring 20 to 60 cm (8 to 24 in) in diameter and can be as tall as 0.5 m (20 in) in height. Two types of nests for this species have been described, one being a simple nest with a noticeable shaft inside, the other being a complex structure surrounded by a mound. These ants use the sun's warmth by decorating their nests with dry materials that heat in a quick duration, providing the nest with solar energy traps. They decorate their nests with seeds, soil, charcoal, stones, sticks, and even small invertebrate corpses. They also camouflage their nests by covering them with leaf litter, debris, and long grass. Nests can be found hidden under rocks, where queens most likely form their colonies, or around small piles of gravel, instead. Their range in southern Australia, like other regional ant species, appears like that of a relict ant. Jack jumpers have been found in dry sclerophyll forests, at elevations ranging from 121 to 1,432 m (397 to 4,698 ft), averaging 1,001 m (3,284 ft). Rove beetles in the genus Heterothops generally thrive in jack jumper nests and raise their brood within their chambers, and skinks have been found in some nests.

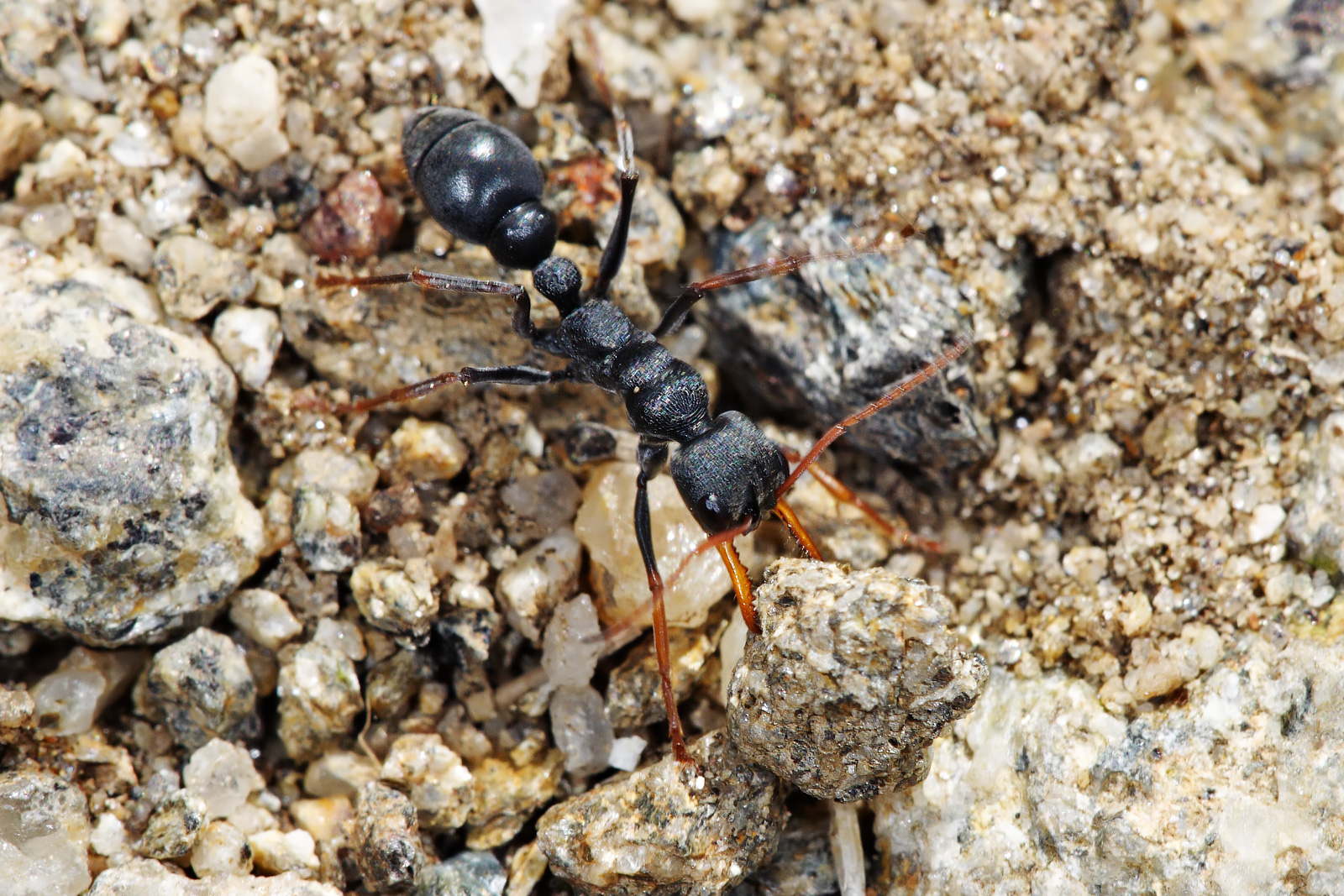
Worker dragging a pebble

Populations are dense in the higher mountain regions of Tasmania. Widespread throughout the state, their presence is known on King Island, located north-west from Tasmania. The ant prefers rural areas, found in warm, dry, open eucalypt woodlands; the climate provides the ant with isolation and warmth. This environment also produces the ant's food, which includes nectar and invertebrate prey. In suburban areas, this ant is found in native vegetation, and uses rockeries, cracks in concrete walls, dry soil, and grass to build nests. One study found suburbs with voluminous vegetation cover such as Mount Nelson, Fern Tree and West Hobart host jack jumper populations, while the heavily urbanised suburbs of North Hobart and Battery Point, do not.

Pest control of the jack jumper ant is successful in maintaining their populations around suburban habitats. Chemicals such as bendiocarb, chlorpyrifos, diazinon, and permethrin are effective against them. Spraying of Solfac into nests is an effective way of controlling nests if they are in a close range of areas with considerable amounts of congestion and human activity. Pouring carbon disulfide into nest holes and covering entrances up with soil is another method of removing colonies. The Australian National Botanic Gardens have an effective strategy of marking and maintaining jack jumper nests.

== Behaviour and ecology ==
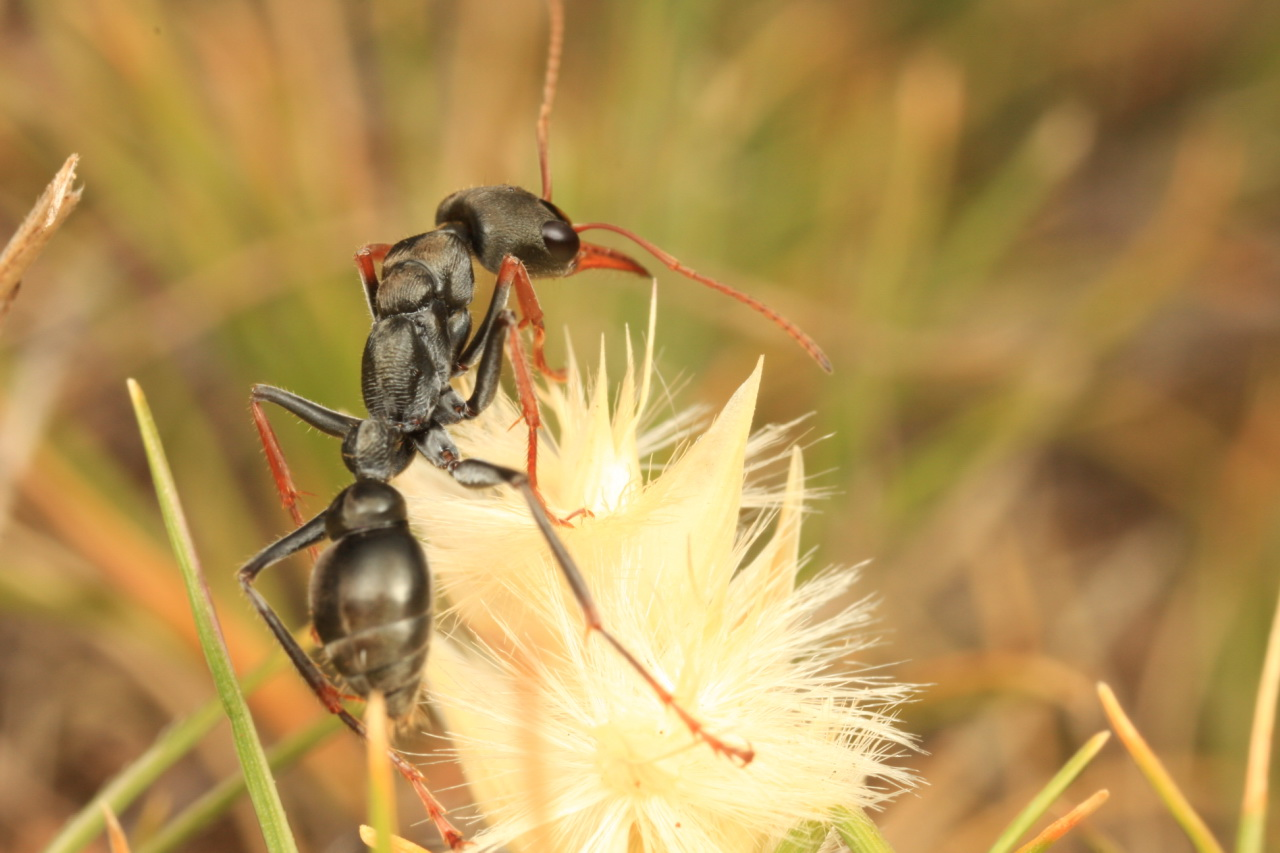
Worker foraging on top of a dry flower

Primarily diurnal, workers search for food during the day until dusk. They are active during warmer months, but are dormant during winter. Fights between these ants within the same colony is not uncommon. They are known for their aggression towards humans, attraction to movement, and well developed vision, being able to observe and follow intruders from 1 m (1.1 yd) away. This species is an accomplished jumper, with leaps ranging from 2 to 3 in (51 to 76 mm). William Morton Wheeler compared jack jumper ants to "Lilliputian cavalry galloping to battle" when disturbed, due to their jumping behaviour. He further wrote that they also made a ludicrous appearance as they emerge from their nests, in a series of short hops.

While no studies have established whether or not these ants contain alarm pheromones, their relative Myrmecia gulosa is capable of inducing territorial alarm using pheromones. If proven, this would explain their ability to attack en masse. Foraging workers are regularly observed on the inflorescences of Prasophyllum alpinum (mostly pollinated by wasps of the subfamily Ichneumonidae). Although pollinia are often seen in the ants' jaws, they have a habit of cleaning their mandibles on the leaves and stems of nectar-rich plants before moving on, preventing pollen exchange. Whether jack jumper ants contribute to pollination is unknown.

=== Diet ===
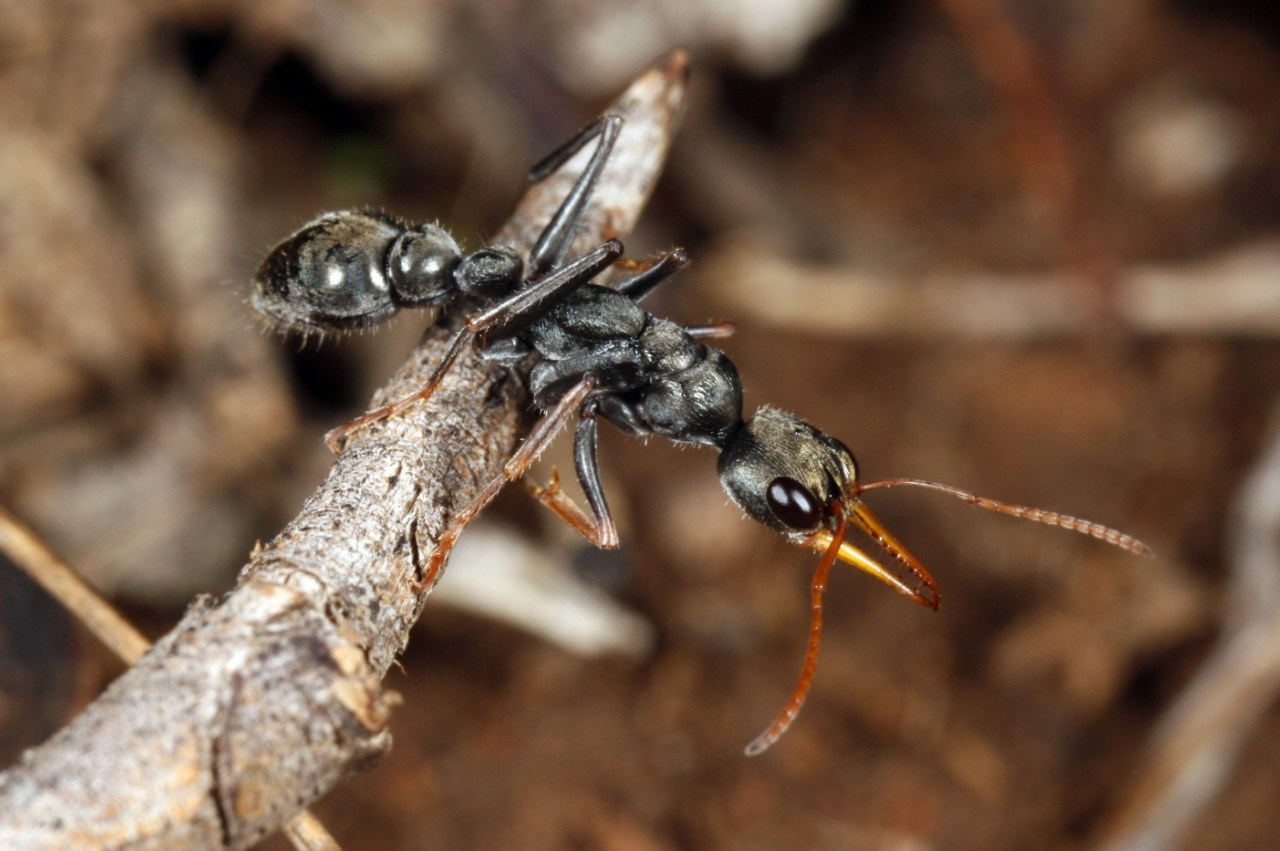
Worker foraging on a branch

Unlike many other ants that use scent to forage for food, jack jumpers use their sight to target their prey, using rapid movements of the head and body to focus on their prey with their enlarged eyes. Like other bull ants, they are solitary when they forage, but only workers perform this role. These ants are omnivores and scavengers, typically foraging in warmer temperatures. They deliver painful stings, which are effective in both killing prey and deterring predators. Jack jumpers have smooth stingers, thus can sting indefinitely. Jack jumper ants are skilled hunters, partially due to their excellent vision; they can even kill and devour wasps and bees. They also kill and eat other ants, such as carpenter ants (Camponotus) and feed on sweet floral secretions and other sugar solutions. They often hunt for spiders, and sometimes follow their prey for a short distance, usually with small insects and small arthropods. Jack jumper ants, alongside M. simillima, have been given frozen houseflies (Musca domestica) and blowflies (Calliphoridae) as food under testing conditions. The ants have been observed to run and leap energetically at flies when they land, particularly on Acacia shrubs, plants, or trees. Jack jumpers and other Myrmecia ants prey on insects such as cockroaches and crickets.

Mature adult ants of this species mostly eat sweet substances, so dead insects they find are given to their larvae. However, larvae are only fed insects when they have reached a particular size. Workers mostly collect small insects, sap-sucking insects along with the honeydew, which is taken to their nests to feed their young. Observations have been made of fly predation by jack jumper ants; they only attack the smaller fly species and ignore larger ones.

=== Lifecycle and reproduction ===
Like every ant, the life of a jack jumper ant starts from an egg. If the egg is fertilised, the ant will be a female (diploid); if not, it will become a male (haploid). They develop through complete metamorphosis, meaning that they pass through larval and pupal stages before emerging as an adult. Cocoons that are isolated from the colony are able to shed their pupal skin before hatching, allowing themselves to advance to full pigmentation. Pupae can also eclose (emerge from their pupal stage) without assistance from other ants. Once born, jack jumper ants can identify distinct tasks, an obvious primitive trait Myrmecia ants are known for.

Based on observations of six worker ants, the average life expectancy of the jack jumper is around 1.3 years, but workers were shown to live as little as 1.12 years or as long as 1.6, with the queen living much longer than the workers at 10 years or more. These data give a life expectancy of 401–584 days, with an average of 474 days. Egg clumping is common, as observed in laboratory colonies. These clumps are often carried by worker ants, and these clumps would contain two to 30 eggs, without any larvae to hold them together. This confirms that eggs from jack jumper colonies do not always lie singly apart. George C. Wheeler and Jeanette Wheeler (1971) studied and described larvae collected from New South Wales and South Australia. They noted that very young larvae of the jack jumper were 2.4 mm (0.094 in) in length, with two types of body hair. They also described young larvae (matured from very young larvae) at 2.7 mm (0.11 in), but with similar body characteristics to mature larvae, at 12.5 mm (0.49 in).

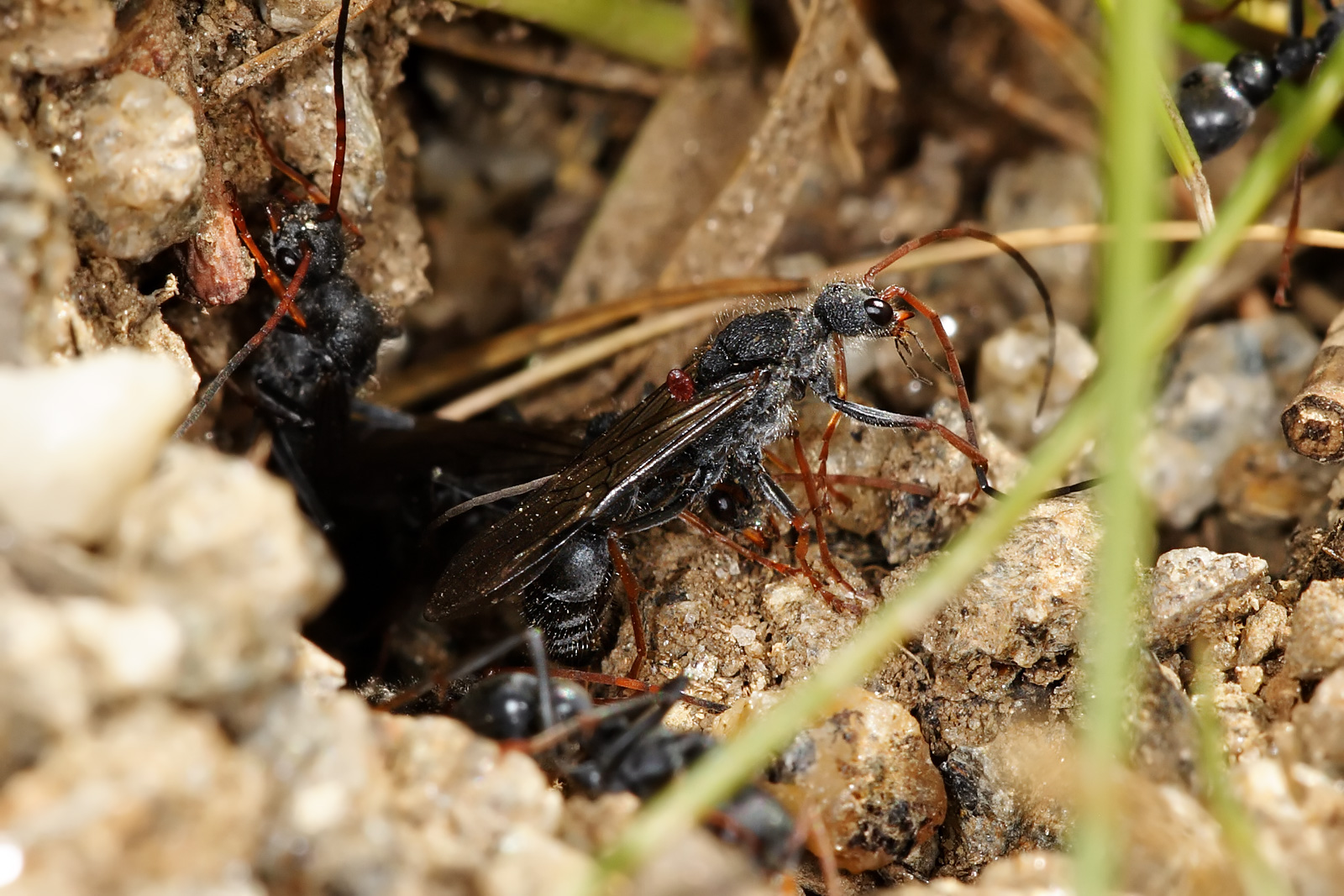
Drones (males) emerging from their nest

Queens are polyandrous, meaning that queens can mate more than once; queens mate with one to nine males during a nuptial flight, and the effective number of mates per queen ranges from 1.0 to 11.4. Most queen ants only mate with one or two males. If the number of available male mates increases, the number of effective matings per queen decreases. Colonies are polygynous, meaning that a colony may house multiple queens; one to four queens typically inhabit a colony, and in multiple-queen colonies, the egg-laying queens are unrelated to one another. Based on a study, 11 of the 14 colonies tested were polygynous (78.57%), showing that this is common in jack jumper colonies. When the queen establishes a nest after mating, she will hunt for food to feed her young, making her semiclaustral. Nests can hold as few as 500 ants or as many as 800 to 1,000. Excavated nests typically have populations ranging from 34 to 344 individuals. Jack jumper ant workers are gamergates, having the ability to reproduce in colonies with or without queens.

Colonies are mainly polygynous with polyandrous queens, but polyandry in jack jumper colonies is low in comparison to other Myrmecia ants, but it is comparable to M. pyriformis ants. In 1979, Craig and Crozier investigated the genetic structure of jack jumper ant colonies, and although queens are unrelated to each other, the occurrence of related queens in a single colony was possible. During colony foundation, suggestions exist of dependent colony foundation in jack jumper queens, although independent colony foundations can occur, as the queens do have fully developed wings and can fly. Isolation by distance patterns have been recorded, specifically where nests that tend to be closer to each other were more genetically similar in comparison to other nests farther away.

As colonies closer to each other are more genetically similar, independent colony foundation is most likely associated with nuptial flight if they disperse far from genetically similar colonies they originate from. Inseminated queens could even seek adoption into alien colonies if a suitable nest site area for independent colony foundation is restricted or cannot be carried out, known as the nest-site limitation hypothesis. Some queens could even try to return to their nests that they came from after nuptial flight, but end in another nest, in association that nests nearby will be similar to the queen's birth nest.

=== Predators and parasites ===
Blindsnakes of the family Typhlopidae are known to consume Myrmecia broods, although smaller blindsnakes avoid them since they are vulnerable to their stings. Predatory invertebrates such as assassin bugs and redback spiders prey on jack jumpers and other Myrmecia ants. Thorny devils and echidnas, particularly the short-beaked echidna (Tachyglossus aculeatus) hunt jack jumper ants, eating their larvae and eggs. Nymphs of the assassin bug species Ptilocnemus lemur lure these ants by trying to make the ant sting them. The jack jumper ant is a host to the parasite gregarines (Gregarinasina). Ants that host this parasite change colour from their typical black appearance to brown. This was discovered when brown jack jumpers were dissected and found to have Gregarinasina spores, while black jack jumpers showed no spores. If it is present in large numbers, the parasite interferes with the normal darkening of the cuticles while the ant is in its pupal stage. The cuticle softens due to the gregarine parasite.

== Genetics ==
The jack jumper ant genome is contained on a single pair of chromosomes (males have just one chromosome, as they are haploid). This is the lowest number known (indeed possible) for any animal, a number shared with the parasitic roundworm Parascaris equorum univalens and the roundworm Diploscapter pachys. Jack jumper ants are taxonomically discussed as a single biological species in the Myrmecia pilosula species complex. The ant has nine polymorphic loci, which yielded 67 alleles.

== Interaction with humans ==
=== History ===
The earliest known account of ant sting fatalities in Australia was first recorded in 1931; two adults and an infant girl from New South Wales died from ant stings, possibly from the jack jumper ant or M. pyriformis. Thirty years later, another fatality was reported in 1963 in Tasmania. Historical and IgE results have suggested these two species or perhaps another species were responsible for all recorded deaths.

Between 1980 and 2000, four deaths have been recorded, all in Tasmania and all due to anaphylactic shock. (Note: The total number of deaths from this 20 year period due to the ant could be higher. One account reports of another fatality in Tasmania and one in New South Wales, although these two deaths may have been caused by a sting from M. pyriformis.) All known patients who died from jack jumper stings were at least 40 years old and had cardiopulmonary comorbidities. Severe laryngeal oedema and coronary atherosclerosis were detected in most of the autopsies of those who died. Most of the victims died within 20 minutes after being stung. Prior to any desensitisation program being established, the fatality rate was one person every four years from the sting.

Before venom immunotherapy, whole body extract immunotherapy was widely used due to its apparent effectiveness, and it was the only immunotherapy used on ants. However, fatal failures were reported and this led to scientists researching for alternative methods of desensitisation. Whole body extract immunotherapy was later proven to be ineffective, and venom immunotherapy was found to be safe and effective to use. Paul Clarke first drew medical attention to the jack jumper ant in 1986, and before this, there had been no history of records of allergic reactions or study on their sting venom. The identification of venom allergens began in the early 1990s in preparation for therapeutic use. Whole body extracts were first used to desensitize patients, but it was found to be ineffective and later withdrawn. Venom immunotherapy was shown to reduce the risk of systemic reactions, demonstrating that immunotherapy can be provided for ant-sting allergies.

In 2003, Professor Simon Brown established the jack jumper desensitisation program, although the program is at risk of closure. Since the establishment of the program, no death has been recorded since 2003. However, the ant may be responsible for the death of a Bunbury man in 2011.

=== Incidence ===
The extent of the jack jumper sting problem differs among areas. Allergy prevalence rates are significantly lower in highly urbanised areas and much higher in rural areas. These ants represent a hazard towards people in the southern states of Australia, due to a high proportion of the population having significant allergies to the ant's sting. The ant is a significant cause of major insect allergies, responsible for most anaphylaxis cases in Australia, and rates of anaphylaxis are twice those of honeybee stings. One in three million annually die of general anaphalaxis in Australia alone. Over 90% of Australian ant venom allergies have been caused by the jack jumper.

The ant is notorious in Tasmania, where most fatalities have been recorded. In 2005, over a quarter of all jack jumper sting incidents were sustained in Tasmania; excessive in comparison to its 2006 population of only 476,000 people. Jack jumper stings are the single most common cause of anaphylaxis in patients at the Royal Hobart Hospital. The ant has also been a major cause of anaphylaxis outside Tasmania, notably around Adelaide and the outskirts of Melbourne, while cases in New South Wales and Western Australia have been more distributed. One in 50 adults have been reported to suffer anaphylaxis due to the jack jumper or other Myrmecia ants.

=== Venom ===
The jack jumper ant and its relatives in the genus Myrmecia are among the most dangerous ant genera and have fearsome reputations for their extreme aggression; Guinness World Records certifies the ant Myrmecia pyriformis as the world's most dangerous ant. The jack jumper have been compared to other highly aggressive ant species, such as Brachyponera chinensis, Brachyponera sennaarensis, and the red imported fire ant (Solenopsis invicta). The retractable sting is located in their abdomen, attached to a single venom gland connected by the venom sac, which is where the venom is accumulated. Exocrine glands are known in jack jumpers, which produce the venom compounds later used to inject into their victims. Their venom contains haemolytic and eicosanoid elements and histamines. It contains a range of active ingredients and enzymatic activity, which includes phospholipase A2 and B, hyaluronidase, acid and alkaline phosphatase. The venom of the ant also contains several peptides; one being pilosulin 1, which causes cytotoxic effects, pilosulin 2, which has antihypertensive properties and pilosulin 3, which is known to be a major allergen. Other pilosulins include pilosulin 4 and pilosulin 5. The peptides have known molecular weights. The LD_{50} (lethal dose) occurs at a lower concentration than for melittin, a peptide found in bee venom. Its LD_{50} value is 3.6 mg/kg (injected intravenously in mice).

Loss of cell viability in the jack jumper's venom was researched through cytometry, which measures the proportions of cells that glow in the presence of fluorescent dye and 7-Aminoactinomycin D. Examinations of the rapidly reproducing Epstein–Barr B-cells showed that the cells lost viability within minutes when exposed to pilosulin 1. Normal white blood cells were also found to alter easily when exposed to pilosulin 1. However, partial peptides of pilosulin 1 were less efficient at lowering cell viability; the residue 22 N-terminal plays a critical role in the cytotoxic activity of pilosulin 1.

20 percent of jack jumper ants have an empty venom sac, so failure to display a sting reaction should not be interpreted as a loss of sensitivity. Substantial amounts of ant venom have been analysed to characterise venom components, and the jack jumper has been a main subject in these studies. An East Carolina University study which summarised the knowledge about ant stings and their venom showed that only the fire ant and jack jumper had the allergenic components of their venom extensively investigated. These allergenic components include peptides found as heterodimers, homodimers and pilosulin 3. Only six Myrmecia ants, including the jack jumper, are capable of inducing IgE antibodies. Due to the vast differentiation of venom produced in each Myrmecia species, and other species sharing similar characteristics to the jack jumper ant, diagnosing which ant is responsible for an anaphylactic reaction is difficult. A review of a patient's history with allergies while identifying a positive result of venom specific IgE levels helps to identify the species of ant that caused a reaction.

=== Signs and symptoms ===
Reactions to the ants sting show similar symptoms to fire ant stings; namely local swelling which lasts for several days, and swelling of the lips, face and eyes may occur from a minor allergic reaction. Other common symptoms include watering of the eyes and nose, and hives or welts will begin to develop. Headaches, anxiety and flushing may also occur. Jack jumpers, bees and wasps are the most common causes of anaphylaxis from insect stings. People most commonly feel a sharp pain after these stings, similar to that from an electric shock. Some patients develop a systemic skin reaction after being stung. Localised envenomation occurs with every sting, but severe envenoming only occurs if someone has been stung many times (as many as 50 to 300 stings in adults). The heart rate increases, and blood pressure falls rapidly. Most people will only experience mild skin irritation after being stung. Those who suffer from a severe allergic reaction will show a wide variety of symptoms. This includes difficulty breathing and talking, the tongue and throat will swell up, and coughing, chest tightness, abdominal pain, nausea and vomiting may occur. Others may lose consciousness and collapse (sometimes people may not collapse), and confusion. Children who get stung will show symptoms such as floppiness and paleness if a severe allergic reaction occurs.

In individuals allergic to the venom (about 2–3% of the population), a sting sometimes causes anaphylactic shock. In comparison to other insects such as the western honeybee (Apis mellifera) and the European wasp (Vespula germanica), their rates are only 1.4% and 0.6%. The annual sting exposure rates in Tasmania for the jack jumper ant, Western honeybee and European wasp are 12%, 7% and 2%. The median time from sting to cardiac arrest is 15 minutes, but the maximum period is around three hours. The ant allergy does not disappear; people with jack jumper allergies will most likely suffer from another allergic reaction if re-stung. Approximately 70 percent of patients with a history of systemic reaction to the ant's sting have another reaction when stung again. In comparison, systemic reaction figures for Apis mellifera and Vespula germanica after being stung show a rate of 50% and 25%. About half of these reactions were life-threatening and occurred predominantly in people who had had previous incidents with the sting. Anaphylaxis in jack jumper ant stings are not rare; 2.9% of 600 residents from semi-rural Victoria had allergic reactions to the ant's sting, according to a questionnaire. The sensitivity to stings is persistent for many years.

In 2011, an Australian ant allergy venom study was conducted, with the goal of determining which native Australian ants were associated with ant sting anaphylaxis. It showed that the jack jumper ant was responsible for the majority of patients' reactions to stings from ants of genus Myrmecia. Of the 265 patients who reacted to such a sting, 176 were from the jack jumper, 15 from M. nigrocincta and three from M. ludlowi, while 56 patients had reacted to other Myrmecia ants. The study concluded that four native species of Australian ants caused anaphylaxis. Apart from Myrmecia species, the green-head ant (Rhytidoponera metallica) was also responsible for several systemic reactions.

Most people recover uneventfully following a mild local reaction and up to about 3% of individuals suffer a severe localised reaction. Most individuals who suffer from severe localised reactions will most likely encounter another reaction if stung again. Fatalities are rare, and venom immunotherapy can prevent fatalities.

=== First aid and emergency treatment ===
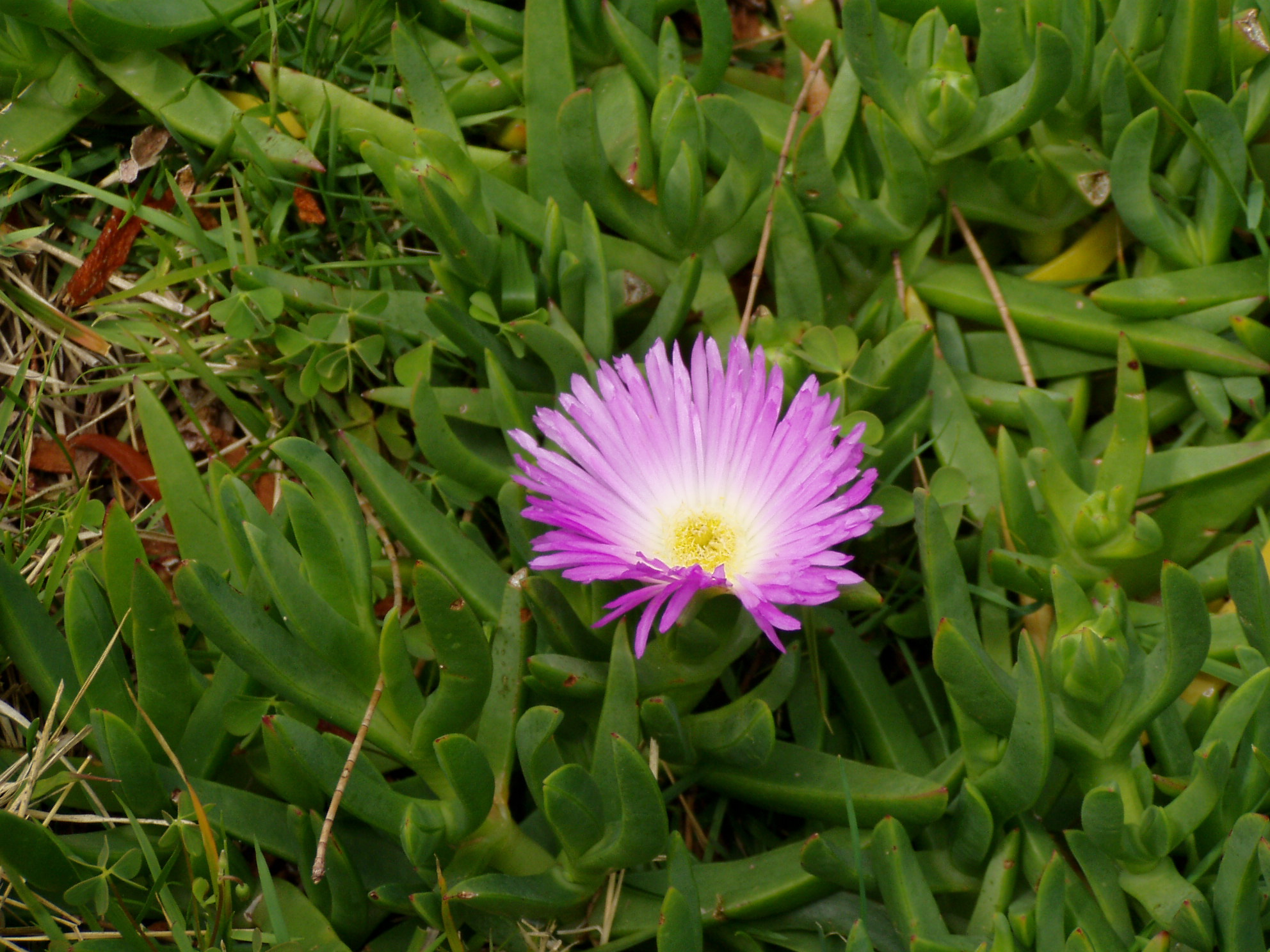
The flowering plant Carpobrotus glaucescens is useful to ease the pain from a sting

If no signs of an allergic reaction are present, an ice pack or commercially available sprays are used to relieve the pain. Stingose is also recommended to treat a jack jumper sting. Other treatments include washing the stung area with soap and water, and if continuous pain remains for several days, antihistamine tablets are taken for one to three days.

Emergency treatment is needed in a case of a severe allergic reaction. Before calling for help, have the person lie down and elevate their legs. Depending on a patient's needs, they will be given an EpiPen or an Anapen to use in case they are stung. In a scenario of experiencing anaphylaxis, further doses of adrenaline and intravenous infusions may be required. Some with severe anaphylaxis may suffer cardiac arrest and will need resuscitation. Inhalers may additionally be used in case a victim has asthma and experiences a reaction from a sting. The use of ACE inhibitors is not recommended, as it is known to increase the risk of anaphylaxis. Medications like antihistamines, H2 blockers, corticosteroids and anti-leukotrienes have no effect on anaphylaxis.

There are several bush remedies used to treat jack jumper stings (and any other Myrmecia sting). The young tips of a bracken fern provide a useful bush remedy to treat jack jumper stings, discovered and currently used by indigenous Australians. The tips are rubbed on the stung area, and may relieve the local pain after getting stung. Another plant used as a bush remedy is Carpobrotus glaucescens (known as angular sea-fig or pigface).

=== Desensitisation and prevention ===
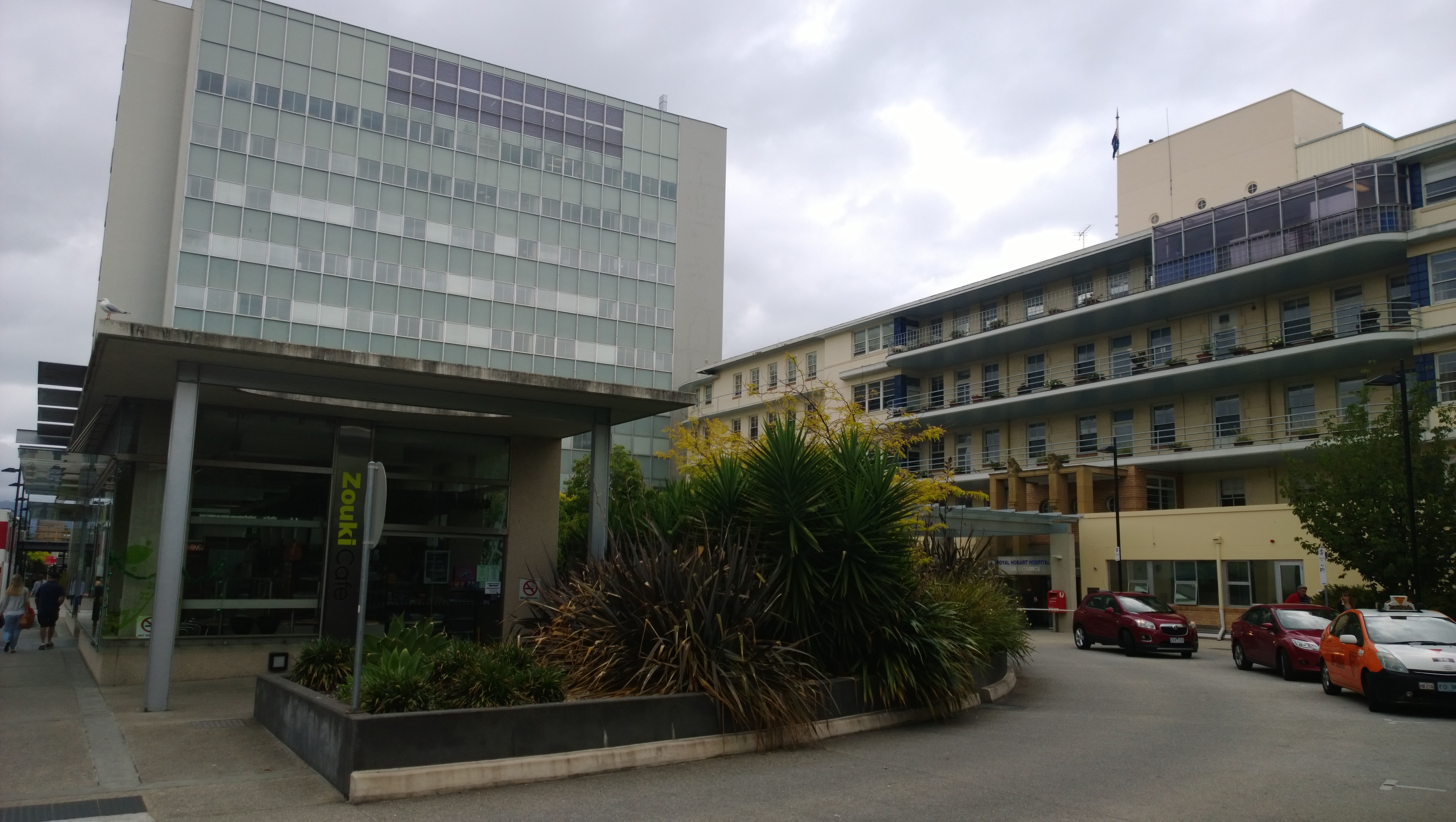
The Royal Hobart Hospital in Hobart, Tasmania offers a desensitisation program for people who are prone to severe anaphylactic reactions to jack jumper ant stings

Desensitisation (also called allergy immunotherapy) to the jack jumper sting venom has shown effectiveness in preventing anaphylaxis, but the standardisation of jack jumper venom is yet to be validated. Unlike bee and wasp sting immunotherapy, jack jumper immunotherapy lacks funding and no government rebate is available. Venom is available; however, no commercial venom extract is available that can be used for skin testing. Venom extract is only available through the Therapeutic Goods Administration Special Access Scheme.

The Royal Hobart Hospital offers a desensitisation program for patients who have had a severe allergic reaction to a jack jumper sting. However, the program may face closure due to budget cuts. Professor Simon Brown, who founded the program, commented, "Closing the program will leave 300 patients hanging in the lurch". There is a campaign to make the program available in Victoria. The Royal Adelaide Hospital runs a small-scale program that desensitises patients to the ant's venom.

Patients are given an injection of venom under the skin in small amounts. During immunotherapy, the first dose is small, but will gradually increase per injection. This sort of immunotherapy is designed to change how the immune system reacts to increased doses of venom entering the body.

Follow-ups of untreated people over thirty with a history of severe allergic reactions would greatly benefit from venom immunotherapy. Both rapid and slow doses can be done safely during immunotherapy. The efficacy (capacity to induce a therapeutic effect) of ant venom immunotherapy is effective in reducing systemic reactions in comparison to placebo and whole body extract immunotherapy, where patients were more likely to suffer from a systemic reaction. Ultrarush initiation of insect immunotherapy may be used, but results show higher risks of allergic reactions. Despite immunotherapy being successful, only ten percent of patients do not have any response to desensitisation.

It is suggested that people should avoid jack jumpers, but this is difficult to do. Closed footwear (boots and shoes) along with socks reduce the chances of encountering a sting, but wearing thongs or sandals will put the person at risk. With this said, they are still capable of stinging through fabric, and can find their way through gaps in clothing. Most stings occur when people are gardening, so taking extra caution or avoiding gardening altogether is recommended. People can also avoid encountering jack jumpers by moving to locations where jack jumper populations are either low or absent, or eliminate nearby nests. Since Myrmecia ants have different venoms, people who are allergic to them are advised to stay away from all Myrmecia ants, especially to ones they have not encountered before.

== See also ==
- Ant stings
- Ants of medical importance
- List of ants of Australia
- Tasmania JackJumpers
