= List of insects known as jack jumper ant =

Jack jumper ant, Myrmecia pilosula, an Australian ant

Jack jumper ant (also known as jumping jack) can also refer to several other species in the same genus:

- Myrmecia fulvipes
- Myrmecia nigrocincta
- Taxa in the Myrmecia pilosula species complex:
  - Myrmecia banksi
  - Myrmecia croslandi
  - Myrmecia haskinsorum
  - Myrmecia imaii
  - Myrmecia impaternata
  - Myrmecia pilosula
