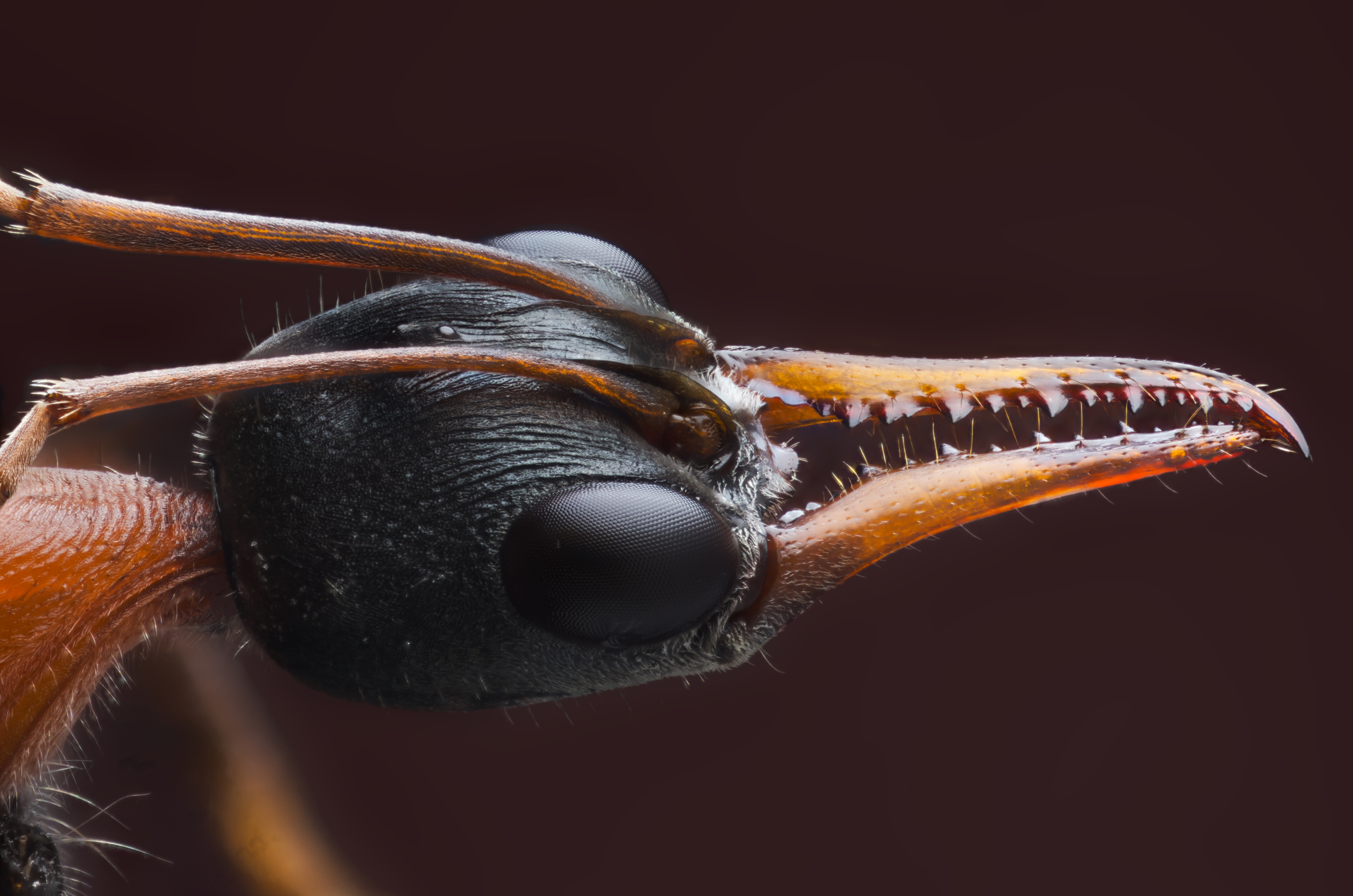
- Close up head detail of M. nigrocincta

Scientific classification
- Kingdom: Animalia
- Phylum: Arthropoda
- Clade: Pancrustacea
- Class: Insecta
- Order: Hymenoptera
- Family: Formicidae
- Subfamily: Myrmeciinae
- Genus: Myrmecia
- Species: M. nigrocincta

Binomial name
- Myrmecia nigrocincta F. Smith, 1858
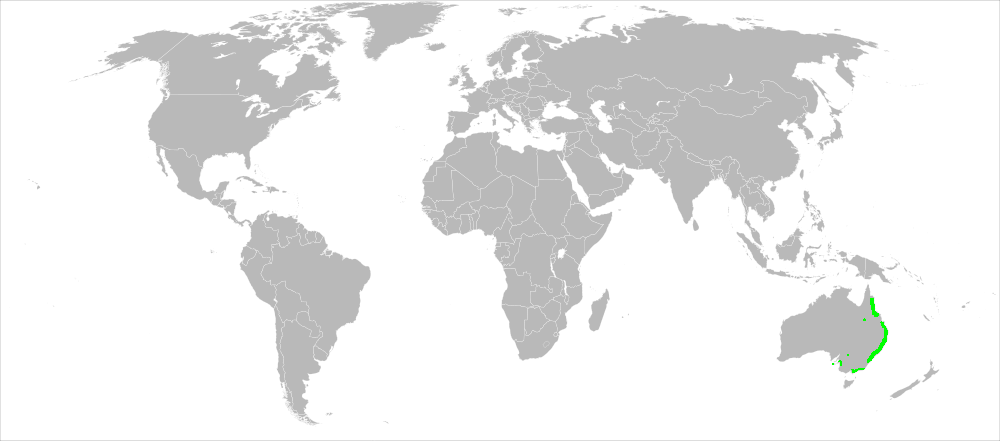
- M. nigrocincta is mainly endemic to the eastern coasts of Australia.

= Myrmecia nigrocincta =

Species of ant

Myrmecia nigrocincta, commonly known as the jumper ant or jumping jack, is an ant of the genus Myrmecia. The species was first described by Frederick Smith in 1858. Colonies of this ant are abundant in eastern Australia. Ants of this species are known for their ability to jump up to 10 centimetres, and they also have a powerful, venomous sting. Rather than foraging on the ground, M. nigrocincta prefer to forage in trees where they are known to pollinate certain flowers.

This ant is a large species, some workers can grow to over 15 mm (0.6 in) in length. They have a distinctive pattern of orange-red and black which distinguishes them from other Myrmecia species. M. nigrocincta workers can reproduce, either in the presence of a queen or in a colony where the queen is missing. Life expectancy of a worker ant is over one year. They are aggressive when attacking intruders.

== Distribution ==
Abundant in eastern Australia, M. nigrocincta ants prefer temperate bushlands, and are usually located in dry to semi-dry forests and sclerophyll woodlands. The species is found in the eastern states of Australia, mostly on the coastal plains where much suitable dry forest habitat can be found. They prefer tropical climates and warm temperatures. They can also be found in other types of habitat at elevations ranging from 80 - 1,220 metres (262 ft - 4,000 ft).

M. nigrocincta colonies have been recorded from Cairns, Atherton, Mackay, Mt. Tamborine, Brisbane, Blackall Range and Fletcher in Queensland. In New South Wales, this ant occurs in Lismore, Dorrigo, Armidale and Sydney (notably in the suburbs of Heathcote and Como), while in Victoria it is found in Trafalgar and Millgrove. Several colonies have also been recorded in South Australia.

== Taxonomy ==
M. nigrocincta was first identified by British entomologist Frederick Smith in 1858, after syntype workers were collected and described in his work Catalogue of hymenopterous insects in the collection of the British Museum part VI. In a study on phylogenetic relationships among species group of the genus Myrmecia, the four species groups with an occipital carina, including the M. nigrocincta group, were found to form a paraphyletic and basal assemblage, while the species groups lacking an occipital carina were shown to have a supported monophyletic assemblage. The type specimen is located in the British Museum.

== Description ==
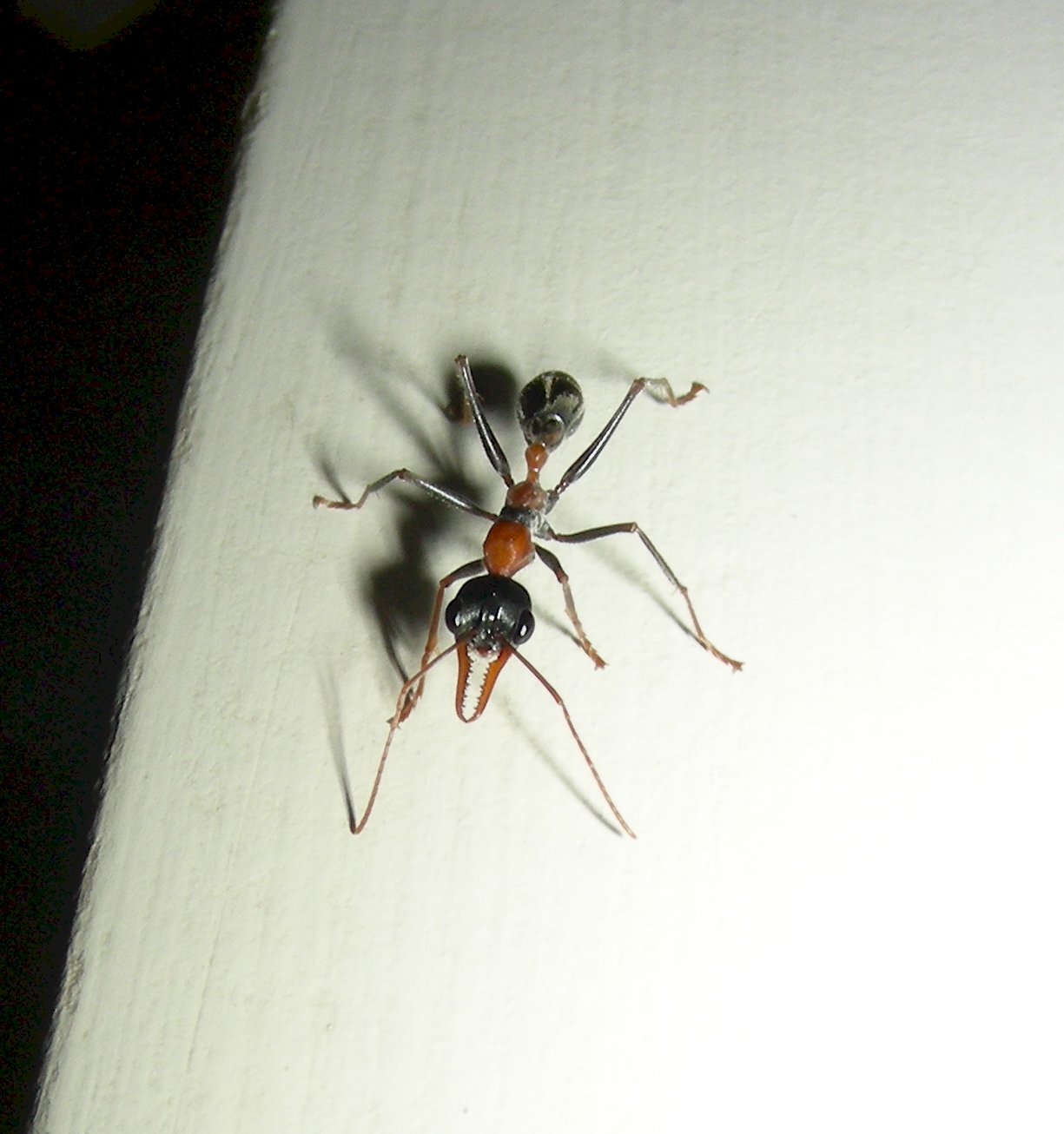
M. nigrocincta worker

Ants of genus Myrmecia are generally referred to as "bulldog ants" and M. nigrocincta, like other species in the genus, has elongated mandibles. M. nigrocincta ants are primarily black and orange-red in colour. They have mandibles which are either black or yellow depending on where the ants are found. The gaster, head, legs and mesonotum are black while the pronotum, propodeum, petiole and post-petiole are red. The ant has linear ridges along the front of its head. It also has apical spurs on the tibia of both its middle leg and hind leg. The legs are thin and become more slender away from the body. M. nigrocincta can be distinguished from other species in the genus Myrmecia by the bi-coloured thorax and post-petiole which are yellowish-red and black and the yellowish-red node.

The workers are 13 to 15 millimetres (0.51 to 0.59 in) long, the males 16 to 17 millimetres (0.63 to 0.67 in) while the female (queen) is 17 to 19 millimetres (0.67 to 0.75 in). The development of the queen's wings is rudimentary and the stubby, reduced wings render the queen flightless.

== Behaviour and ecology ==
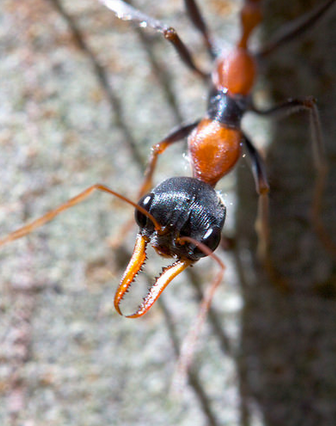
The large eyes on M. nigrocincta provide excellent vision when it forages

M. nigrocincta is an accomplished jumper with leaps ranging from 76 to 102 millimetres (3 to 4 in). It has good vision and can be observed running amongst plants and leaves, occasionally jumping from one branch to another. It is mostly found foraging on plants, trees, and other vegetation, but it sometimes forages on the ground. It propels its jumps by a sudden extension of its middle and hind legs.

M. nigrocincta ants are diurnal and do not hibernate. They are omnivores, and feed on other insects including caterpillars and spiders, as well as honey water. M. nigrocincta has been observed to prey on the larvae of imperial hairstreak butterflies, even jumping while carrying them. Predators of M. nigrocincta (and the genus Myrmecia as a whole) include spiders, birds, lizards, mammals and other predatory invertebrates, including assassin bugs and redbacks. The ants have been recorded visiting flowers of Eucalyptus regnans and Senna acclinis and are considered as a possible pollination vector for E. regnans trees. Although Senna acclinis is self-compatible, the inability of M. nigrocincta to appropriately release pollen would restrict capacity to effect pollination.

These ants live in nests in sandy soil which sometimes have a mound, which resembles a molehill. M. nigrocincta ants labor to conceal their nests using twigs and leaves. Depending on the type of habitat in which the colony is located, they decorate the nest with plant material and gravel. Other materials that are used to camouflage M. nigrocincta colonies include dry leaves, rocks, vegetation, and twigs. Nests are beside a clump of grass or bush or at the base of a tree.

The colonies of M. nigrocincta ants are monogyne, i.e. they have only one queen per colony. The queen is semi-claustral, meaning that during the founding of the new colony, the queen has to forage so that she has enough food to raise her brood. Colonies have between 400 and 1200 individuals and are thus considered to be "large" colonies.

The worker and scout M. nigrocincta ants use pheromones for communication. They are quick to defend their nests and may react aggressively even to a shadow crossing their nest. Wheeler (1922) describes the reaction of M. nigrocincta to the disturbance of their nest as "they bound out of their small mound nest in a series of short hops like Lilliputian cavalry galloping to battle." The ants aggressively defend their colony, causing multiple bites and willingly sacrificing themselves to protect the queen and the colony.

== Life cycle ==
M. nigrocincta workers are able to reproduce in both queenless and queenright (colonies with a queen) colonies. This means a colony which loses its queen can still thrive in the absence of the queen. In laboratory colonies of M. nigrocincta where there was no queen present, worker-laid eggs were reared to mature males, showing that workers are highly fertile. The average life expectancy of an adult worker M. nigrocincta ant is 1.1 to 1.2 years, with a maximum expectancy of 1.3 years (400 or more days). Larvae collected from M. nigrocincta are 4.7mm in length but increase to 9.7mm when matured.

== Venom ==
M. nigrocincta ants have highly venomous stings which are painful and produce intense burning sensations. The sensations last for many days and the sting itches. If left untreated, the sting may develop into an ulcer. The venom of another species, M. pilosula, is amongst the strongest of the Formicidae and contains active ingredients such as acid and alkaline phosphatases, hyaluronidase, as well as phospholipases A2 and B. In a 2011 Australian ant allergy venom study, the objective of which was to determine what native Australian ants were associated with ant sting anaphylaxis, it was shown that 265 of the 299 participants for whom a cause was determined had reacted to the sting of several Myrmecia species. Of these, 176 reacted to the M. pilosula, 15 to M. nigrocincta, three to M. ludlowi, and 56 to other Myrmecia ants. The study concluded that four main groups of Australian ants were responsible for causing anaphylaxis. Besides Myrmecia species, these included the green-head ant (Rhytidoponera metallica).

== See also ==
- Ant stings
- Ants of medical importance
