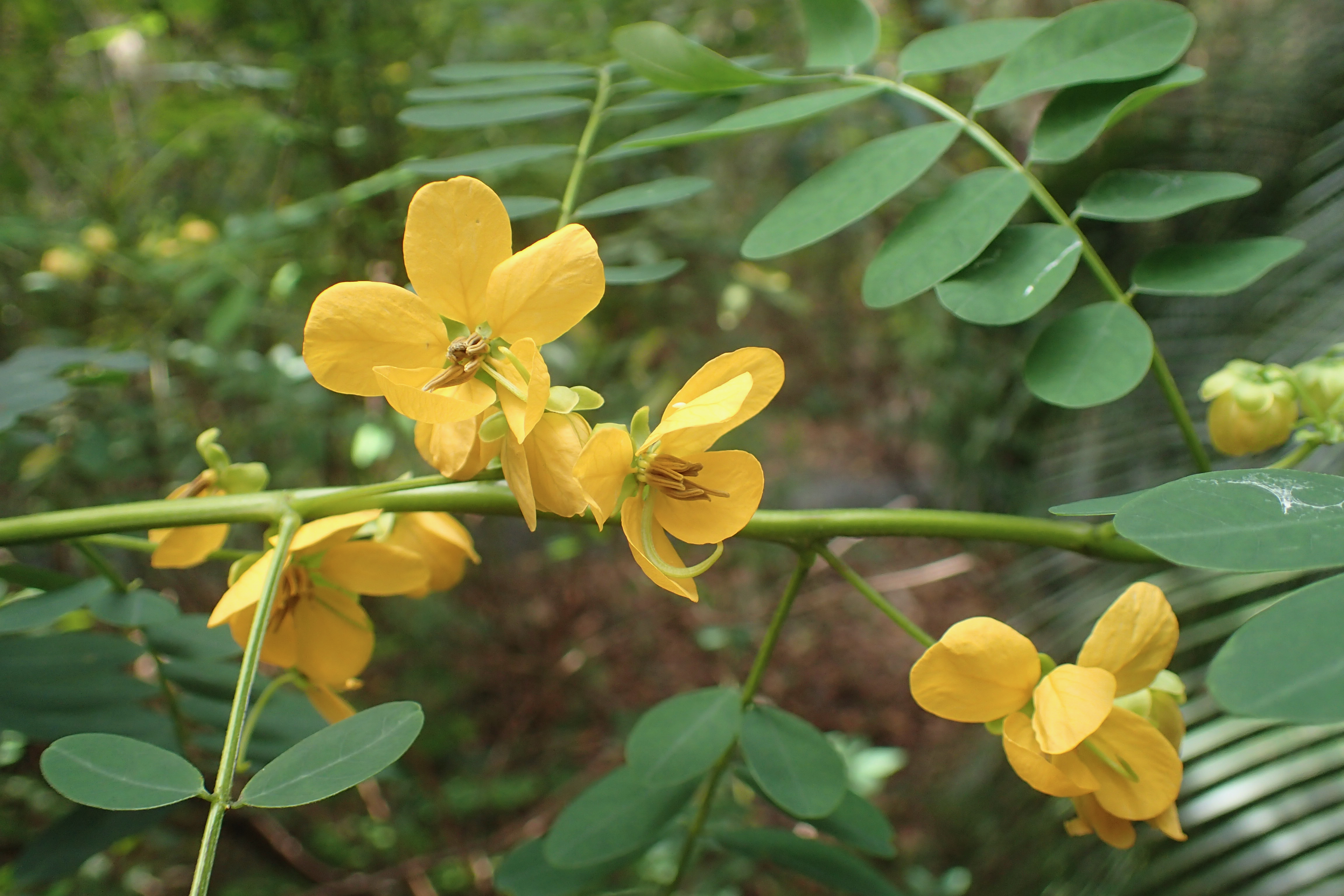
- In the North Coast Regional Botanic Garden

Scientific classification
- Kingdom: Plantae
- Clade: Tracheophytes
- Clade: Angiosperms
- Clade: Eudicots
- Clade: Rosids
- Order: Fabales
- Family: Fabaceae
- Subfamily: Caesalpinioideae
- Genus: Senna
- Species: S. acclinis

Binomial name
- Senna acclinis (F.Muell.) Randell

Synonyms
- Cassia acclinis F.Muell.

= Senna acclinis =

Rainforest senna

Species of legume

Habit

Senna acclinis, commonly known as rainforest cassia or brush senna, is a species of flowering plant in the family Fabaceae and is endemic to near-coastal areas of eastern Australia. It is a shrub with pinnate leaves and bright golden yellow flowers in groups of two to five and long, narrow seed pods. It is similar to other species of Senna that are environmental weeds.

== Description ==
Senna acclinis is a shrub that typically grows to a height of 3 m (9.8 ft). Its leaves are pinnate, up to 150 mm (5.9 in) long on a petiole 20–40 mm (0.79–1.57 in) long, with five to seven pairs of broadly elliptic leaflets up to 50 mm (2.0 in) long and 15 mm (0.59 in) wide. There is a gland between the lower one to four pairs of leaflets. From two to five bright golden yellow flowers are arranged on a peduncle 20–40 mm (0.79–1.57 in) long, each flower with ten fertile stamens, the anthers usually of unequal lengths and 5–6 mm (0.20–0.24 in) long. Flowering occurs in spring and summer. The fruit is a more or less flat pod 120–150 mm (4.7–5.9 in) long and 6–8 mm (0.24–0.31 in) wide that ripens in summer and autumn. This species can be mistaken for other introduced Senna species that are environmental weeds.

== Taxonomy ==
Rainforest senna was first formally described in 1863 by Ferdinand von Mueller who gave it the name Cassia acclinis in Fragmenta Phytographiae Australiae. In 1998, Barbara Rae Randell and Bryan Barlow changed the name to Senna acclinis in Journal of the Adelaide Botanic Garden.

== Distribution and habitat ==
Senna acclinis is found in near-coastal areas of New South Wales and Queensland, growing in or on the edges of subtropical and dry rainforests. The plant is distributed in several subregions, including Barrington, Karuah Manning, Mummel Escarpment, Wyong, and Yengro.

== Ecology ==
Senna acclinis is known to be a pollination plant for several insect species, including native bees and the jack-jumper ant Myrmecia nigrocincta, which has been recorded several times visiting the flowers of S. acclinis. Flowers sprout during springs and summer.

== Conservation status ==
The species has been classed as "endangered" under the New South Wales Government Biodiversity Conservation Act 2016. The main threats to S. acclinis are clearance of habitat for development, introduced and invasive species of weeds, timber harvesting activities, and accidental removal during weed-control programs.
