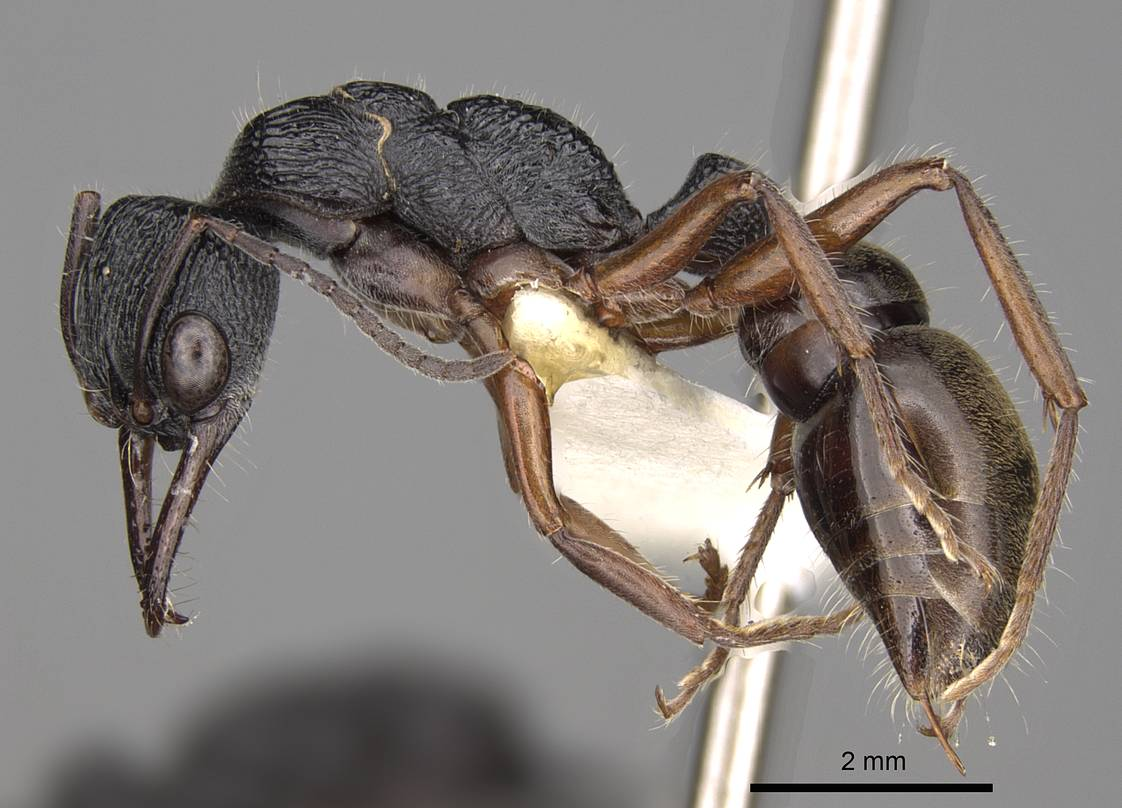

Scientific classification
- Kingdom: Animalia
- Phylum: Arthropoda
- Class: Insecta
- Order: Hymenoptera
- Family: Formicidae
- Subfamily: Myrmeciinae
- Genus: Myrmecia
- Species: M. fulvipes

Binomial name
- Myrmecia fulvipes Roger, 1861

= Myrmecia fulvipes =

Species of ant from Australia

Myrmecia fulvipes is a bull ant belonging the genus Myrmecia. Native to Australia, these bull ants are found in Tasmania, Victoria, New South Wales, and Queensland.

== Characteristics ==
Ants of the genus Myrmecia are commonly known as "bull ants". This species is similar in appearance to the jack jumper ant. Their jaws and most of their body are coloured black, with their legs being orange and their abdomen being a golden colour. Workers are 9-13 millimetres long and their queens are larger at 14-16 millimetres long.

Like the jack jumper ant, they have the ability to jump short distances. The usually use this tactic to flee or to attack their targets. Their sting is relatively mild. Their main source of food is insects for their larvae and honey water.
