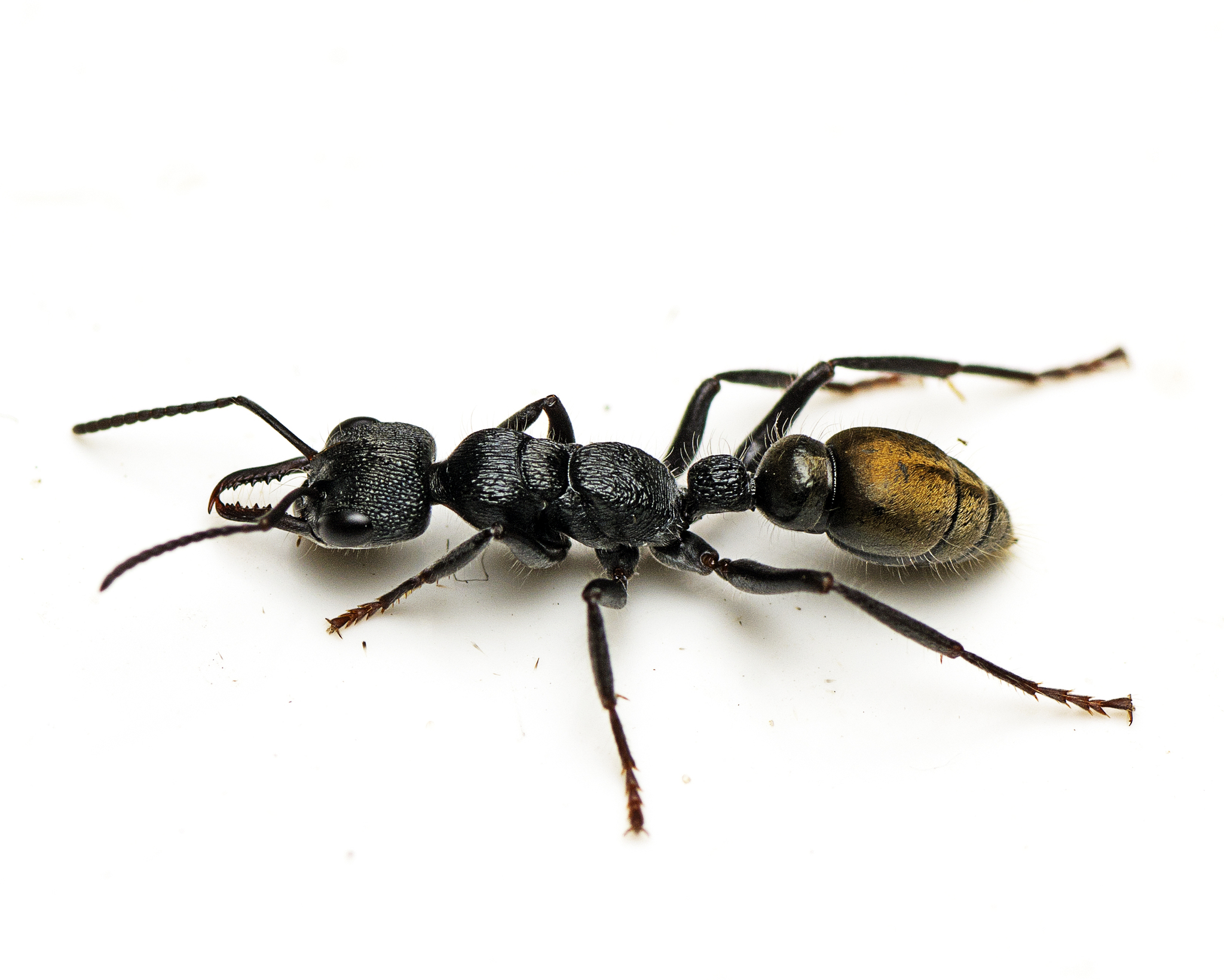

Scientific classification
- Kingdom: Animalia
- Phylum: Arthropoda
- Class: Insecta
- Order: Hymenoptera
- Family: Formicidae
- Subfamily: Myrmeciinae
- Genus: Myrmecia
- Species: M. queenslandica

Binomial name
- Myrmecia queenslandica Forel, 1915

= Myrmecia queenslandica =

Species of ant

Myrmecia queenslandica is an Australian ant species. Abundant to most states in Australia, and mainly seen in Queensland, they belong to the genus Myrmecia.

The typical length of a Myrmecia queenslandica bull ant is 11–13 millimetres. The appearance of this species is similar to Myrmecia michaelseni, and also are similar size. Most of their body is black, but pubescence on the gaster has a more yellowish colour.
