= Myrmecia impaternata =

Scientific classification
- Kingdom: Animalia
- Phylum: Arthropoda
- Clade: Pancrustacea
- Class: Insecta
- Order: Hymenoptera
- Family: Formicidae
- Subfamily: Myrmeciinae
- Genus: Myrmecia
- Species: M. impaternata

Binomial name
- Myrmecia impaternata Taylor, 2015

Species of ant endemic to Australia

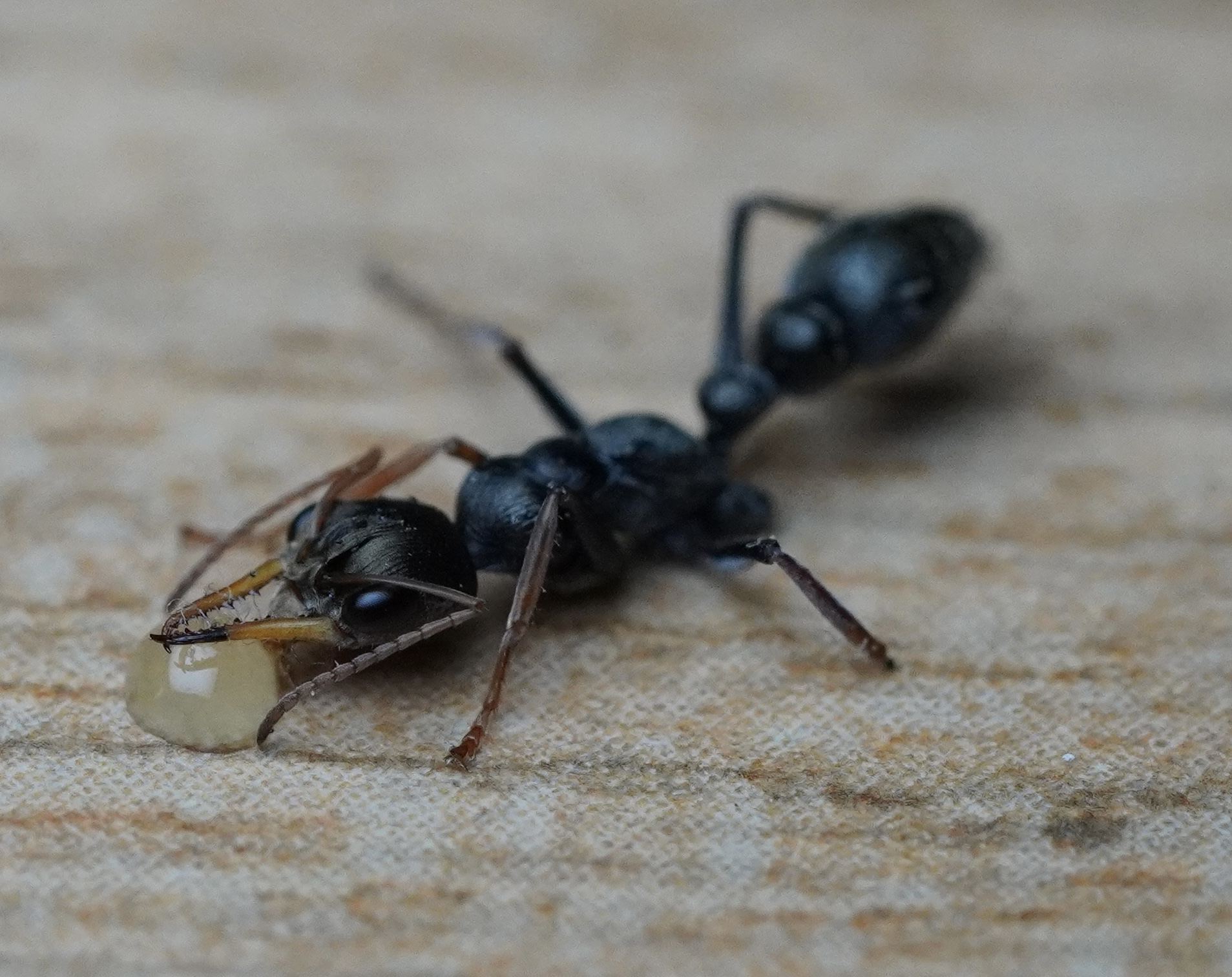
Myrmecia impaternata worker drinking honey - Photo by Cadel Johnson (Ants Epping)

Myrmecia impaternata is a species of gynogenetic, female-only ant in the genus Myrmecia. Described by Robert Taylor in 2015, the species is endemic to Australia and is common in Canberra and around Armidale. Observations of the species have been confirmed in Queensland.

Myrmecia impaternata is a hybrid species, with its origin tracing back to Myrmecia banksi and Myrmecia pilosula.
