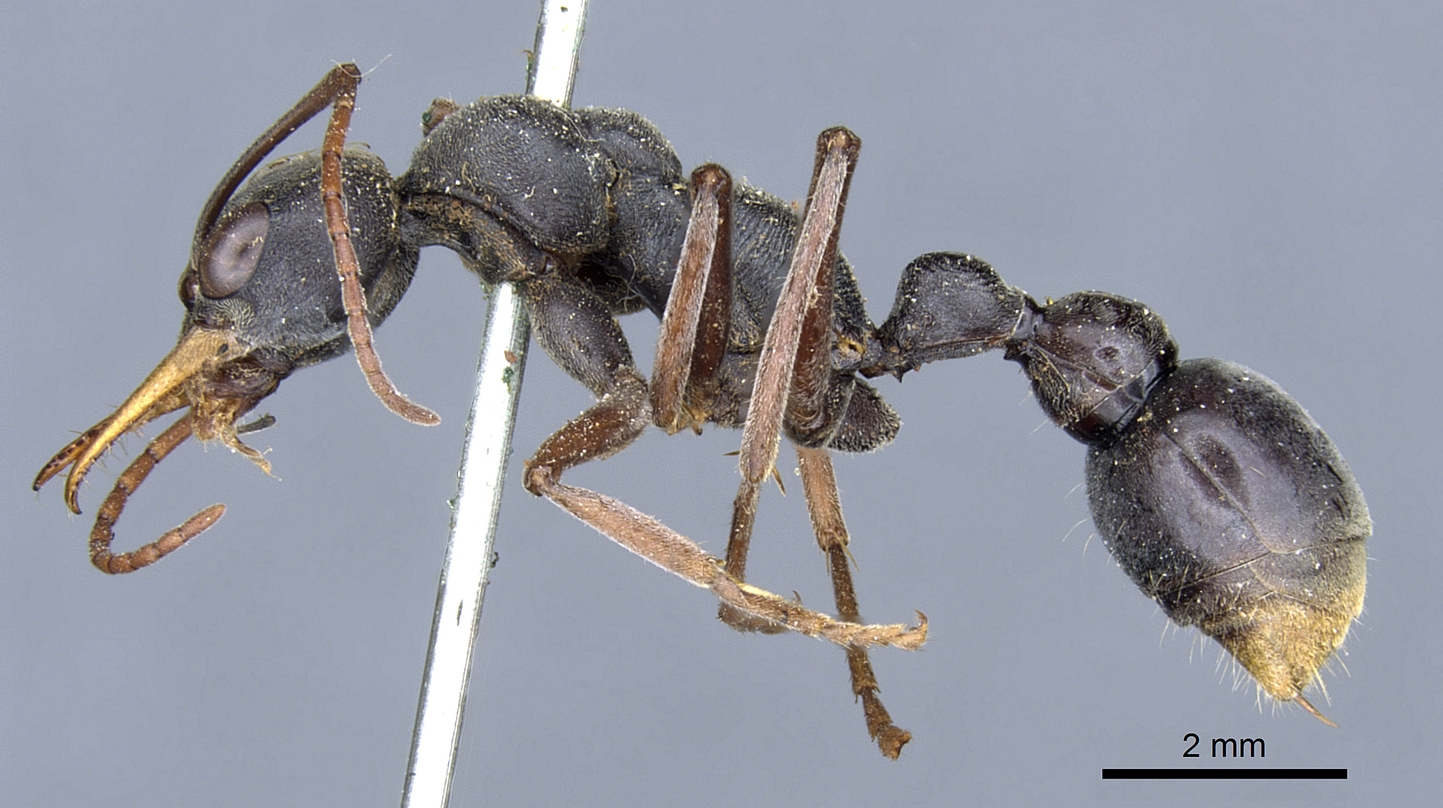

Scientific classification
- Kingdom: Animalia
- Phylum: Arthropoda
- Class: Insecta
- Order: Hymenoptera
- Family: Formicidae
- Subfamily: Myrmeciinae
- Genus: Myrmecia
- Species: M. apicalis

Binomial name
- Myrmecia apicalis Emery, 1883

= Myrmecia apicalis =

Species of ant

Myrmecia apicalis is the only Australian bull ant species that is not native to Australia. The Myrmecia apicalis is the only species to be found on a different country, with two collections founded on New Caledonia. It was described in 1883.

Not many specimens have been collected, but their size is around 13 millimetres. Their appearance is similar when compared to the Myrmecia pilosula. Details of other specimens such as their males are not clear. The only known details of the Myrmecia apicalis are from specimens of workers.
