= Myrmecia dispar =

Scientific classification
- Kingdom: Animalia
- Phylum: Arthropoda
- Class: Insecta
- Order: Hymenoptera
- Family: Formicidae
- Subfamily: Myrmeciinae
- Genus: Myrmecia
- Species: M. dispar

Binomial name
- Myrmecia dispar Clark, 1951

Species of ant

Myrmecia dispar is an Australian ant which belongs to the genus Myrmecia. This species is native to Australia. They are distributed nationwide, and the species was first described by John S. Clark in 1951.

The average size of a typical worker ant is 9.5-11 millimetres, making the Myrmecia dispar among the smallest species of bull ant. The head and gaster are of a chocolate brown colour, thorax, node, and the legs are reddish-brown, and the mandibles and tarsi are a reddish-yellow colour.
