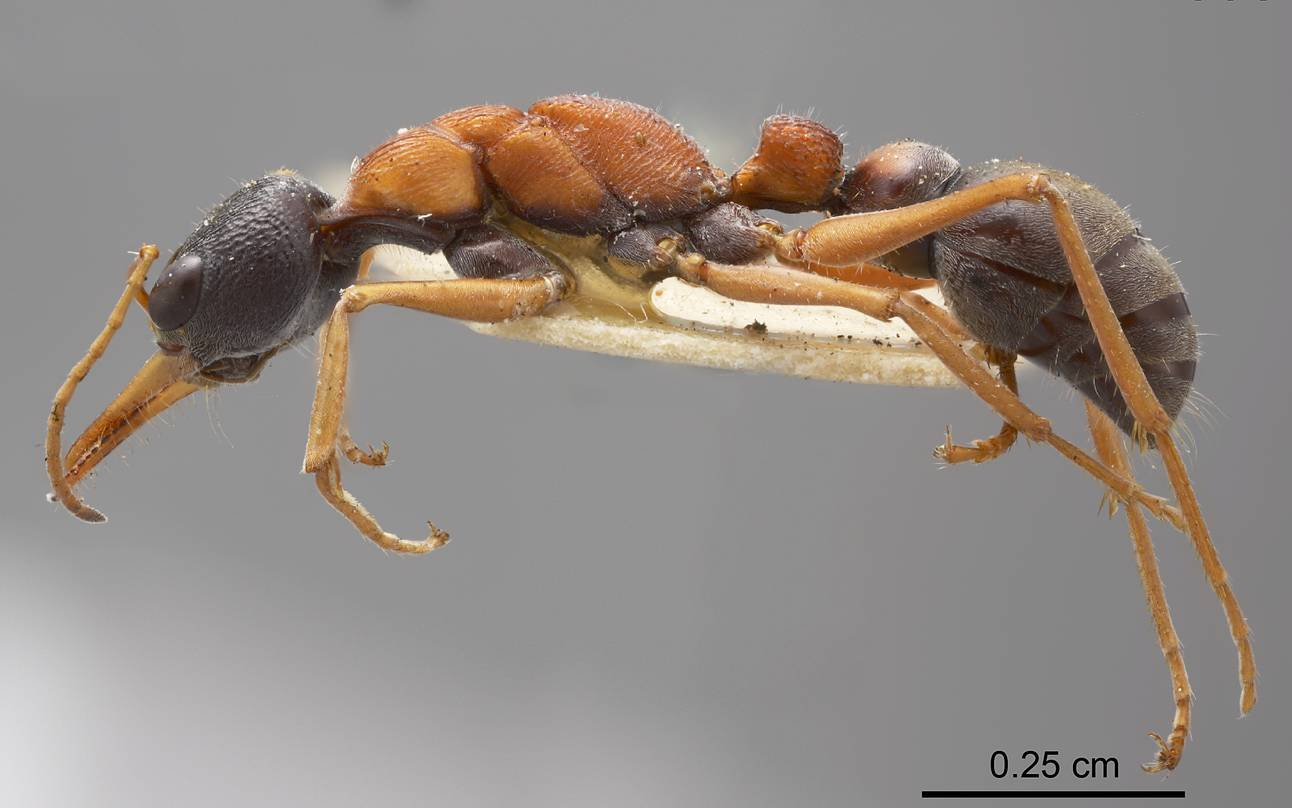
- Myrmecia elegans worker specimen

Scientific classification
- Kingdom: Animalia
- Phylum: Arthropoda
- Class: Insecta
- Order: Hymenoptera
- Family: Formicidae
- Subfamily: Myrmeciinae
- Genus: Myrmecia
- Species: M. elegans

Binomial name
- Myrmecia elegans Clark, 1943

= Myrmecia elegans =

Species of ant

Myrmecia elegans is an Australian ant which belongs to the genus Myrmecia. It is a native species to Australia. The Myrmecia elegans is distributed in the more western states and regions of the country.

The average length for the Myrmecia elegans is 13–14.5 millimetres. The head, gaster, and other features are black, thorax and node (i.e. nodus) are bright red, the mandibles and antennae are yellow. Legs are a reddish yellow colour.

The mandibles are often quite dark in colour, but can also be light yellow. The mesosoma varies from uniformly red or orange to bicoloured dark red and black.
