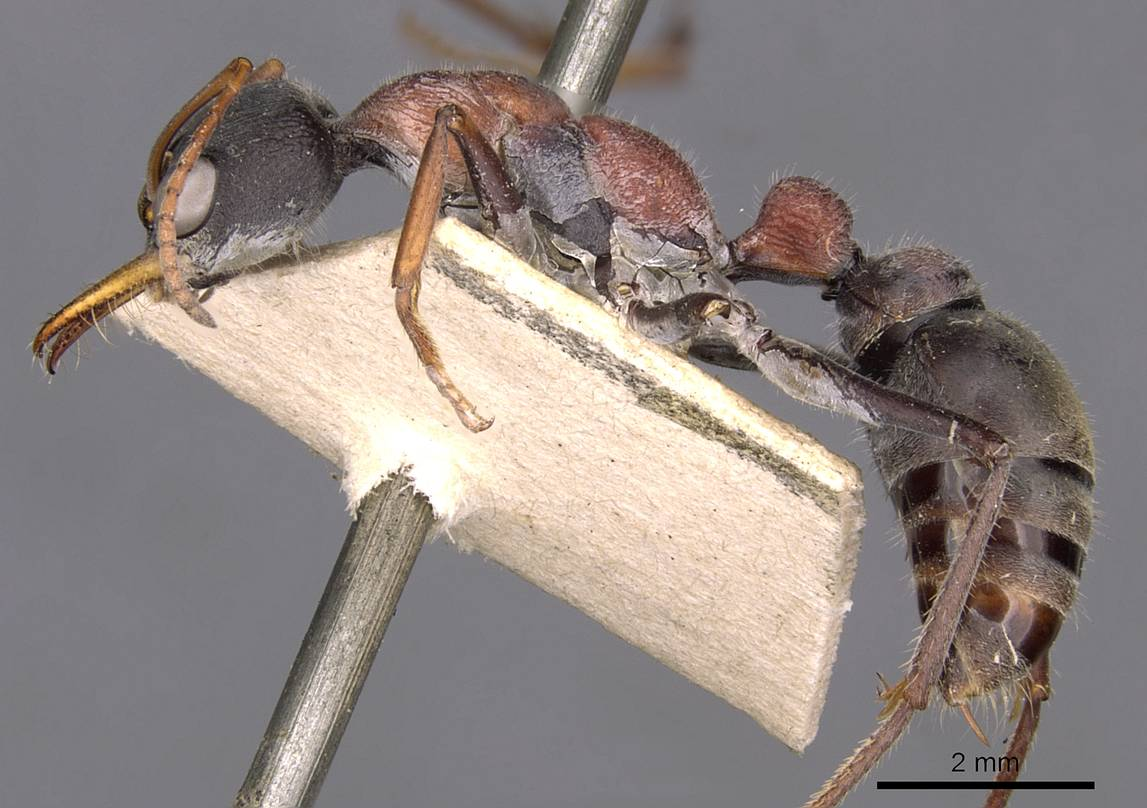

Scientific classification
- Kingdom: Animalia
- Phylum: Arthropoda
- Clade: Pancrustacea
- Class: Insecta
- Order: Hymenoptera
- Family: Formicidae
- Subfamily: Myrmeciinae
- Genus: Myrmecia
- Species: M. harderi

Binomial name
- Myrmecia harderi Forel, 1910

= Myrmecia harderi =

Species of ant

Myrmecia harderi is an Australian bull ant species which is part of the genus Myrmecia. They are native to Australia. They are mainly distributed in New South Wales, and some parts of Victoria, South Australia, and Queensland.

The average length of Myrmecia harderi is 14.5 millimetres (0.57 in). The head, thorax and gaster are black, mandibles are yellow, antennae and tarsi are a reddish-yellow, and legs are brown.
