= Myrmecia croslandi =

Scientific classification
- Kingdom: Animalia
- Phylum: Arthropoda
- Clade: Pancrustacea
- Class: Insecta
- Order: Hymenoptera
- Family: Formicidae
- Subfamily: Myrmeciinae
- Genus: Myrmecia
- Species: M. croslandi

Binomial name
- Myrmecia croslandi Taylor, 1991

Species of ant endemic to Australia

Myrmecia croslandi is a species of bull ant which is endemic to Australia. Myrmecia croslandi is a jumping type of bull ant, which means it could be called a jack jumper. Myrmecia croslandi are located around Australia. They can be seen throughout New South Wales and Queensland. Myrmecia croslandi was described by Taylor in 1991.

== Taxonomy ==
Previously considered a kind of twin-better known and polymorphic species Myrmecia pilosula. Thanks to a unique chromosome being genetically isolated in 1986 and in 1991, Australian myrmecologist Robert Taylor described it as a separate species.

== Genome ==
Myrmecia croslandi is the only species of eukaryote with the simplest karyotype possible, that being a single chromosome in haploid males. Females have two chromosomes (one pair).
