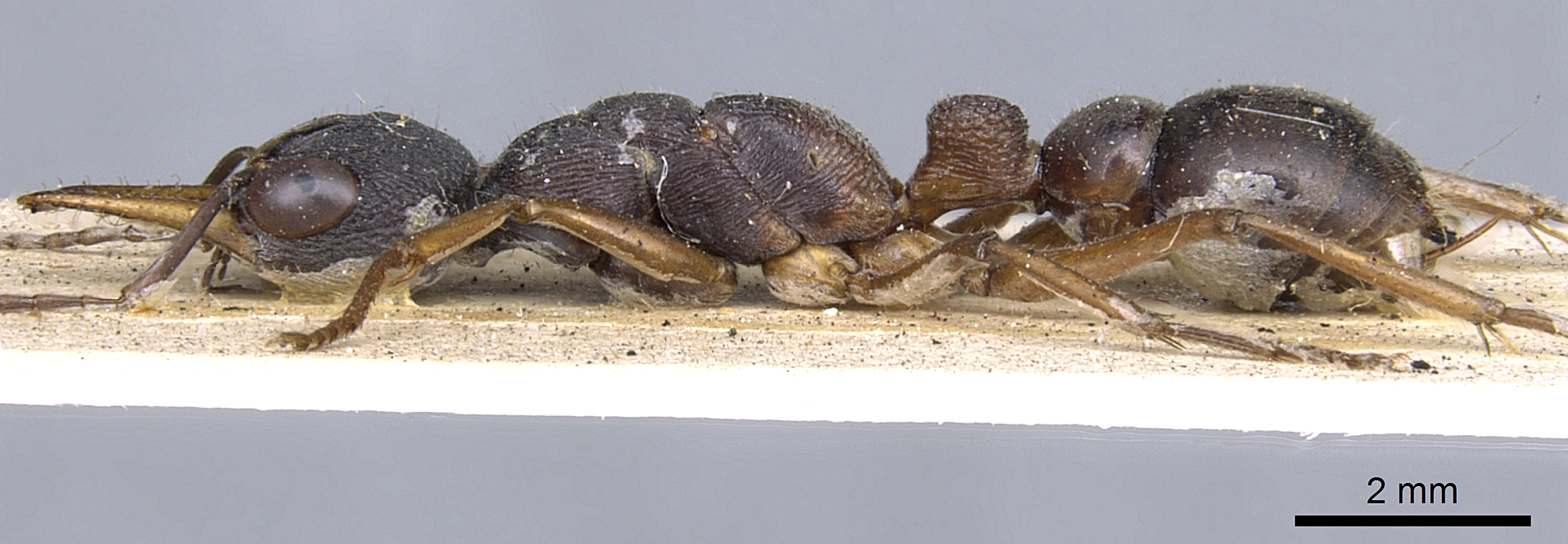
- Worker

Scientific classification
- Kingdom: Animalia
- Phylum: Arthropoda
- Class: Insecta
- Order: Hymenoptera
- Family: Formicidae
- Subfamily: Myrmeciinae
- Genus: Myrmecia
- Species: M. occidentalis

Binomial name
- Myrmecia occidentalis Clark, 1943

= Myrmecia occidentalis =

Species of ant endemic to Australia

Myrmecia occidentalis is a species of ant. It belongs to the genus Myrmecia and was described by John S. Clark in 1943. Native to Australia, Myrmecia occidentalis is mainly distributed in the state of Western Australia.

The average worker Myrmecia occidentalis is 11-12 millimetres in length, and the queens are slightly larger at 13 millimetres. The head, gaster and other features are black, mandibles and labrum yellow, and the legs, funiculus, and other features are red. The antennae is the same colour as the mandibles.
