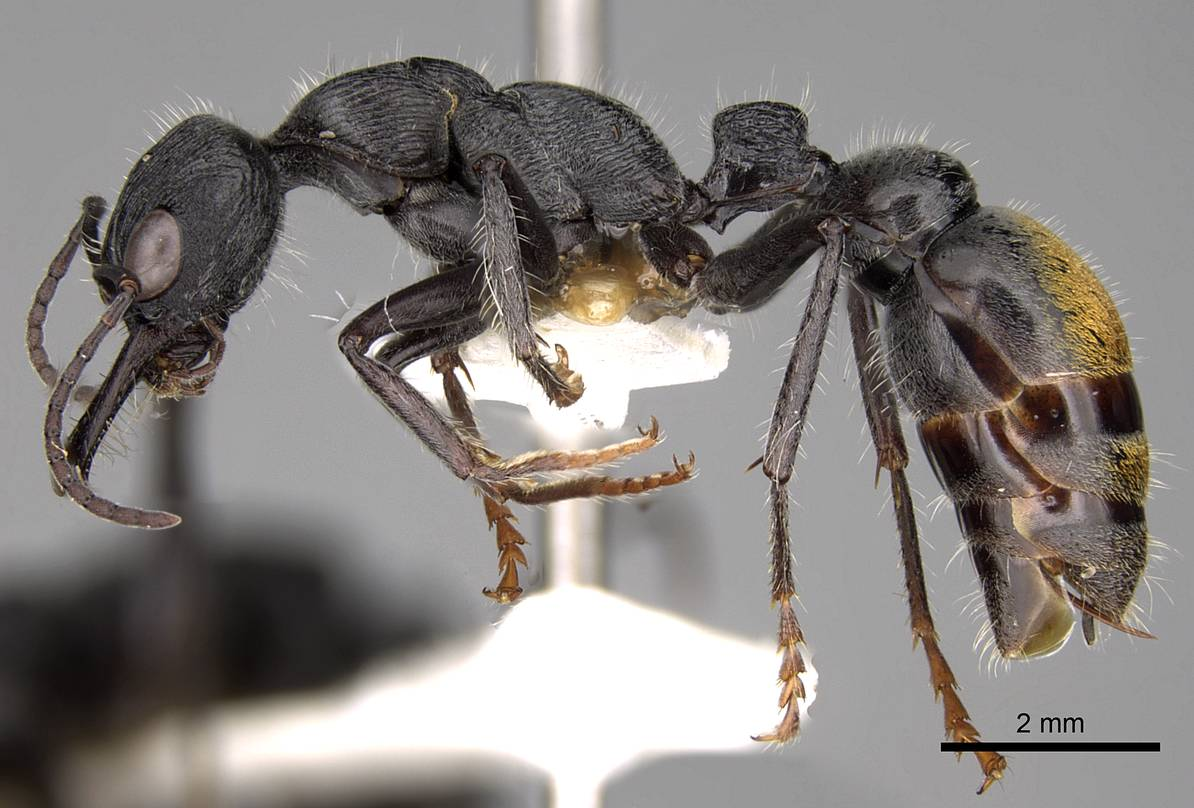

Scientific classification
- Kingdom: Animalia
- Phylum: Arthropoda
- Class: Insecta
- Order: Hymenoptera
- Family: Formicidae
- Subfamily: Myrmeciinae
- Genus: Myrmecia
- Species: M. michaelseni

Binomial name
- Myrmecia michaelseni Forel, 1907

= Myrmecia michaelseni =

Species of ant

Myrmecia michaelseni is an Australian ant which belongs to the genus Myrmecia. This species is native to Australia. They are mostly distributed and studied in Western Australia.

The average length of a worker ant is 10-12 millimetres long. Queens are 13.5-15 millimetres long, and males are smaller. They are similar to the Jack jumper ant. They are mostly black, but the mandibles, antennae and legs are light brown, and the tarsi is reddish. The colours for the queen is exactly the same as the workers.
