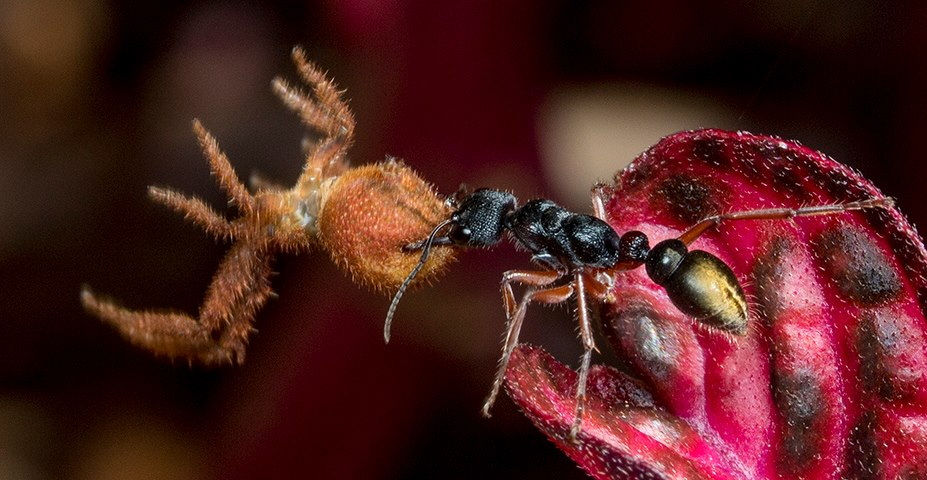

Scientific classification
- Kingdom: Animalia
- Phylum: Arthropoda
- Class: Insecta
- Order: Hymenoptera
- Family: Formicidae
- Subfamily: Myrmeciinae
- Genus: Myrmecia
- Species: M. chrysogaster

Binomial name
- Myrmecia chrysogaster Clark, 1943

= Myrmecia chrysogaster =

Species of ant endemic to Australia

Myrmecia chrysogaster (known as the toothed bullant) is an Australian ant which belongs to the genus Myrmecia. This species is native to Australia. They are distributed in Queensland and New South Wales.

The body length of the Myrmecia chrysogaster is around 15 millimetres. Their head is black, the mandibles and anterior coxae is a brown colour. The legs are of a red colour and the abdomen is golden yellow.
