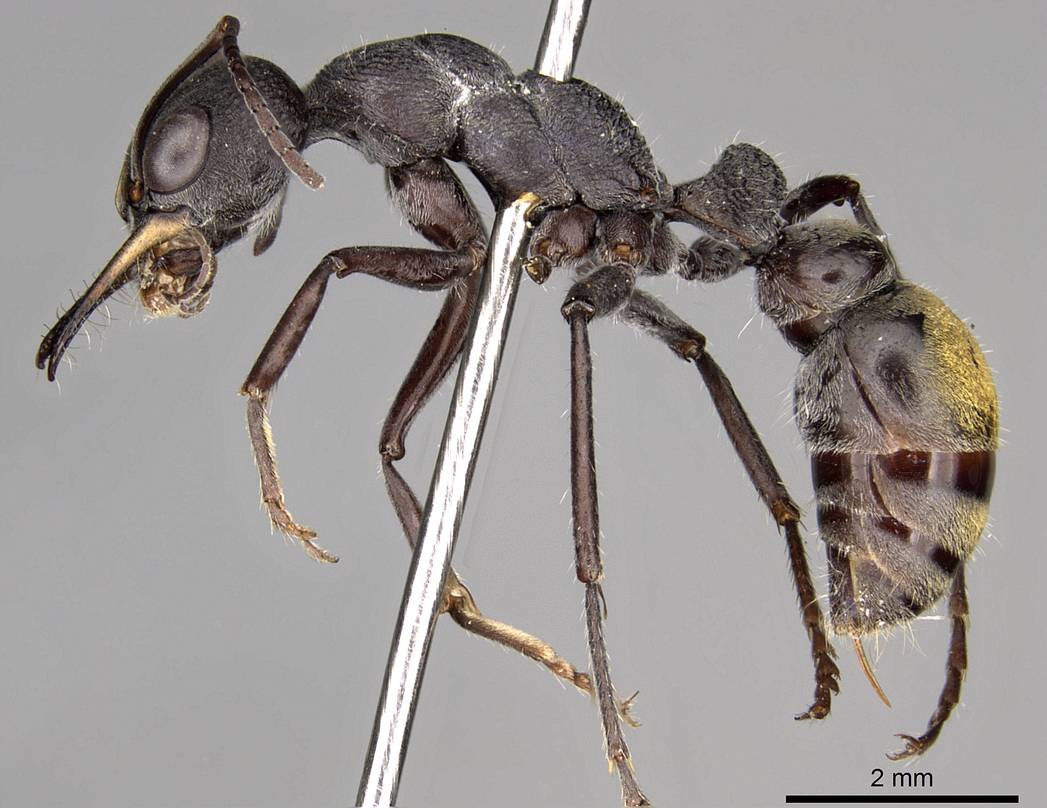

Scientific classification
- Kingdom: Animalia
- Phylum: Arthropoda
- Class: Insecta
- Order: Hymenoptera
- Family: Formicidae
- Subfamily: Myrmeciinae
- Genus: Myrmecia
- Species: M. cydista

Binomial name
- Myrmecia cydista Clark, 1943

= Myrmecia cydista =

Species of ant endemic to Australia

Myrmecia cydista is an Australian ant which belongs to the genus Myrmecia. This species is endemic to Australia. They are typically distributed in New South Wales and Queensland, and have been seen in several other states.

The Myrmecia cydista is a small bull ant species. The workers are only around 9-12 millimetres in length. The colour of the species is mainly black, but the mandibles are yellow, the antennae and legs are brown, and the tarsi is a reddish-brown colour.
