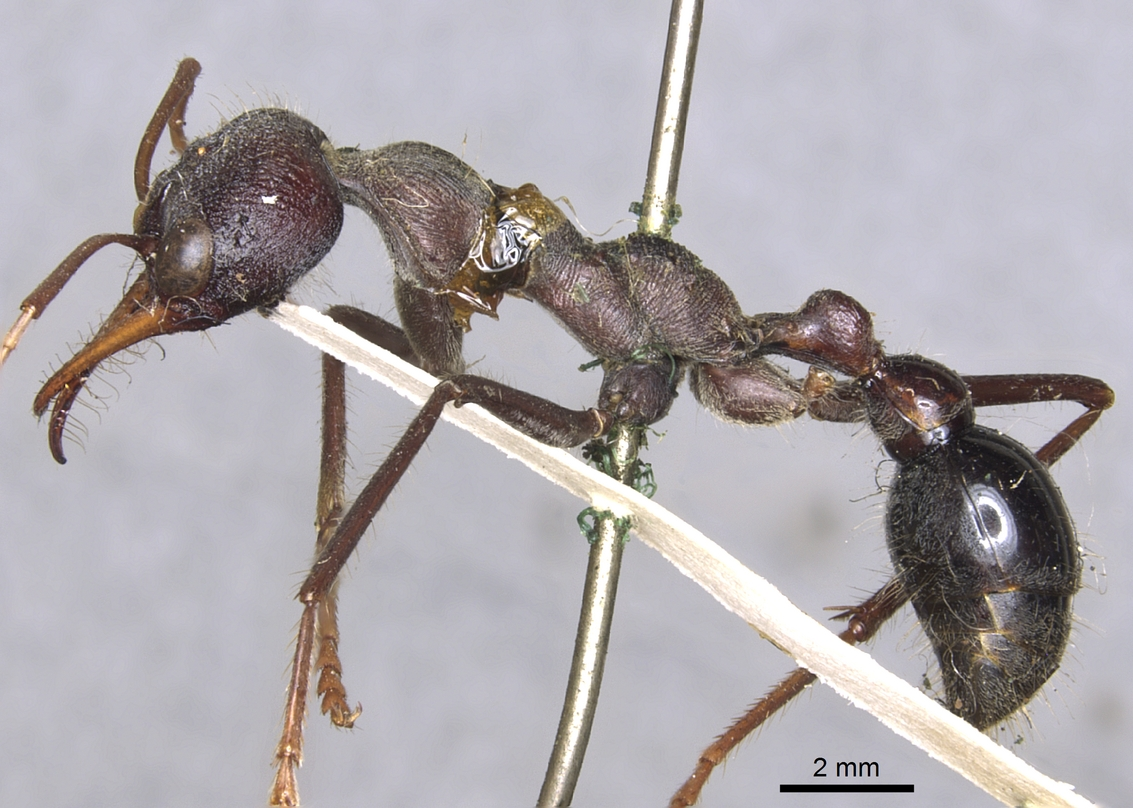
- Myrmecia simillima worker

Scientific classification
- Kingdom: Animalia
- Phylum: Arthropoda
- Class: Insecta
- Order: Hymenoptera
- Family: Formicidae
- Subfamily: Myrmeciinae
- Genus: Myrmecia
- Species: M. simillima

Binomial name
- Myrmecia simillima Smith, 1858

= Myrmecia simillima =

Species of ant

Myrmecia simillima is an Australian ant which belongs to the genus Myrmecia. This species is native to Australia. Their distribution in Australia is massive on the coastline and inland areas of New South Wales and Victoria.

The average length for a worker ant of a Myrmecia simillima is 19-23 millimetres long. Queens are of a bigger size at 22-24 millimetres in length. The head, thorax, node, and other features are brown, gaster is black, mandibles and legs and other parts are reddish, with the tarsi and funiculus is a yellowish-red.
