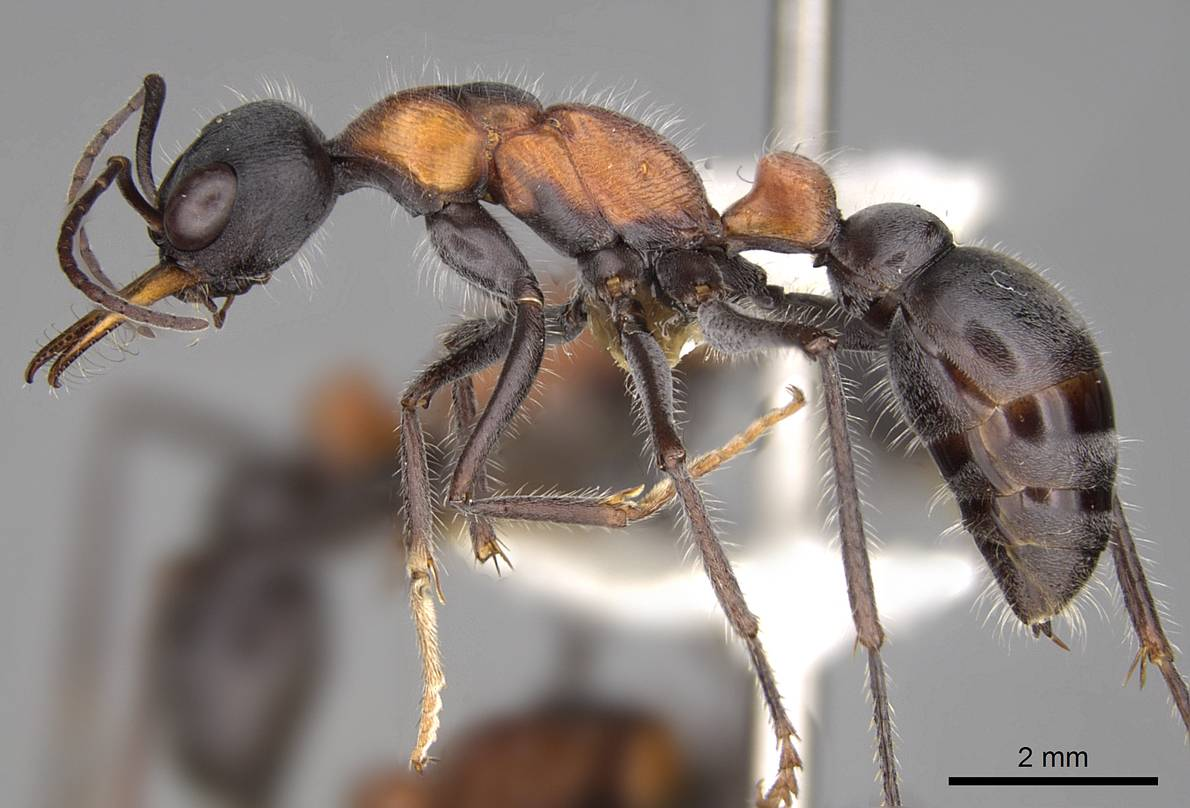

Scientific classification
- Kingdom: Animalia
- Phylum: Arthropoda
- Class: Insecta
- Order: Hymenoptera
- Family: Formicidae
- Subfamily: Myrmeciinae
- Genus: Myrmecia
- Species: M. chasei

Binomial name
- Myrmecia chasei Forel, 1894

= Myrmecia chasei =

Species of ant

Myrmecia chasei is an Australian ant which belongs to the genus Myrmecia. This species is native to Australia. The Myrmecia chasei has a large presence and distribution in the south-eastern areas of Western Australia.

== Description ==
The length of a worker ant in the Myrmecia chasei species is around 12–15.5 millimetres long. However workers can get larger than the average length. Queens are 22-24 millimetres long while males are only 14.5 millimetres. The head of this species is a black colour, the antennae and legs are brown, and the mandibles are a yellow colour. The thorax and node is in a light red colour.
