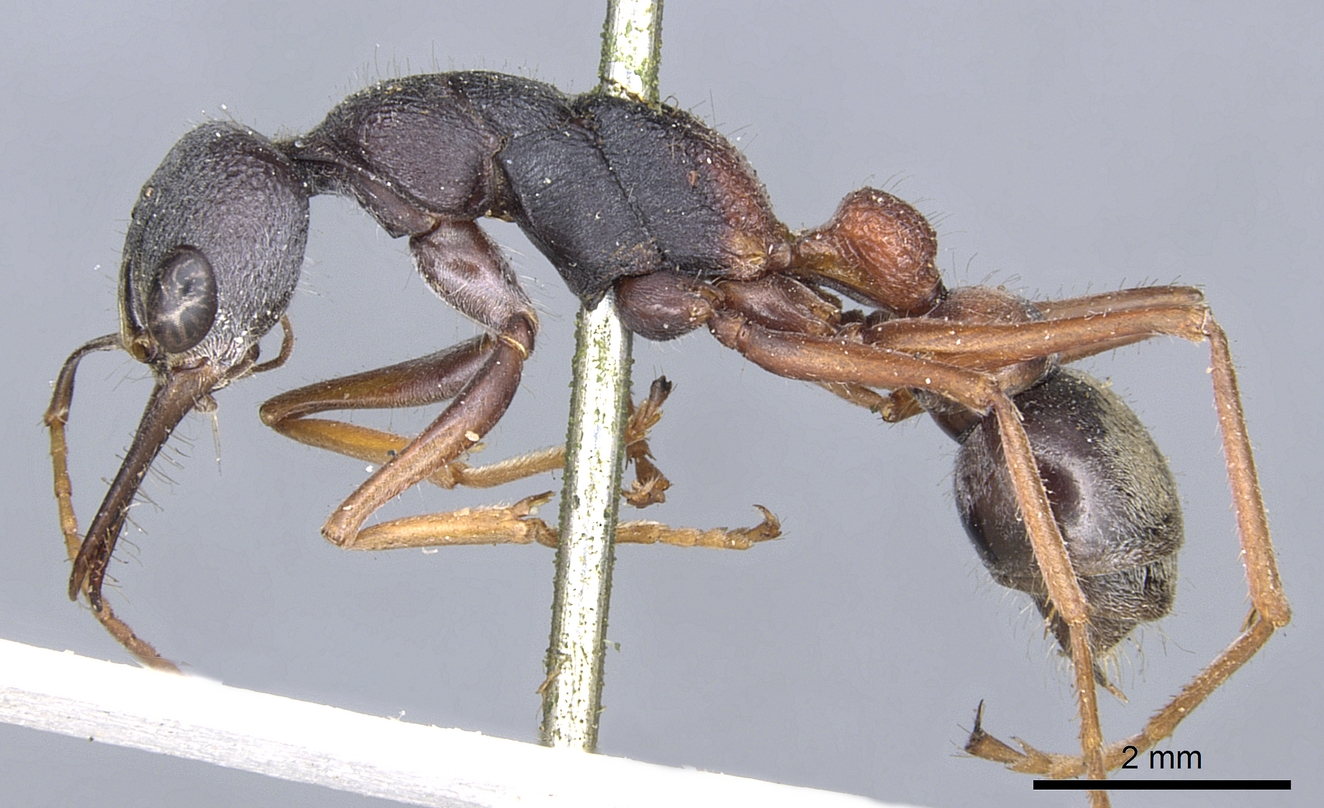

Scientific classification
- Kingdom: Animalia
- Phylum: Arthropoda
- Class: Insecta
- Order: Hymenoptera
- Family: Formicidae
- Subfamily: Myrmeciinae
- Genus: Myrmecia
- Species: M. varians

Binomial name
- Myrmecia varians Mayr, 1876

= Myrmecia varians =

Species of ant endemic to Australia

Myrmecia varians is an Australian ant which belongs to the genus Myrmecia. This species is endemic to Australia. The Myrmecia varians is one of the most distributed ants in the country, with the species being observed in every single state and territory except for Tasmania. Myrmecia varians was first described by Mayr in 1876.

== Appearance ==
The Myrmecia varians is a smaller species of bull ant. Average worker ants measure approximately 11–12.5 millimetres in length, while queens can grow up to 15–16 millimetres. The head, thorax, and gaster are black. The mandibles, basal segments, and half of the scapes are yellowish-brown. The apex and teeth are a more reddish color. The legs are yellowish-red, and both the node and postpetiole are also red.
