= Myrmecia haskinsorum =

Scientific classification
- Kingdom: Animalia
- Phylum: Arthropoda
- Clade: Pancrustacea
- Class: Insecta
- Order: Hymenoptera
- Family: Formicidae
- Subfamily: Myrmeciinae
- Genus: Myrmecia
- Species: M. haskinsorum

Binomial name
- Myrmecia haskinsorum Taylor, 2015

Species of ant

The Alpine jack-jumper ant, Myrmecia haskinsorum is a species of jack-jumper ant in the genus Myrmecia. Described by Robert Taylor in 2015, the species is endemic to Australia where it is known from areas that have high elevations, although some records show the ant lives in low elevated areas in Tasmania.

== Discovery and taxonomy ==
Myrmecia haskinsorum was named for the entomologists Caryl Parker Haskins and Edna Haskins. It is a member of the Myrmecia pilosula species complex. The name M. haskinsorum was used in a publication in 1994, however the species was not formally described until 2015.

== Morphology ==
Myrmecia haskinsorum is a dark brown ant with a bluish cast (only visible in live specimens). The jaws, antennae, and the distal portions of the legs are yellow-orange. M. haskinsorum is distinguished from other species of the Mymecia pilosula complex by its relative lack of hair.

== Distribution ==
Myrmecia haskinsorum inhabits alpine woodland and shrubland and is primarily found at high elevations; it can be found up to 1200m above sea level. Specimens have been collected from the Snowy Mountains, the Victorian Alps, and upland Tasmania. M. haskinsorum is a cold-tolerant species; Taylor (2015) notes that the nests of this ant are often covered by snow.

== Scientific research ==
Differing sources have given the chromosomal number of M. haskinsorum as 2n = 10 (five pairs) and 2n = 18 (nine pairs).
