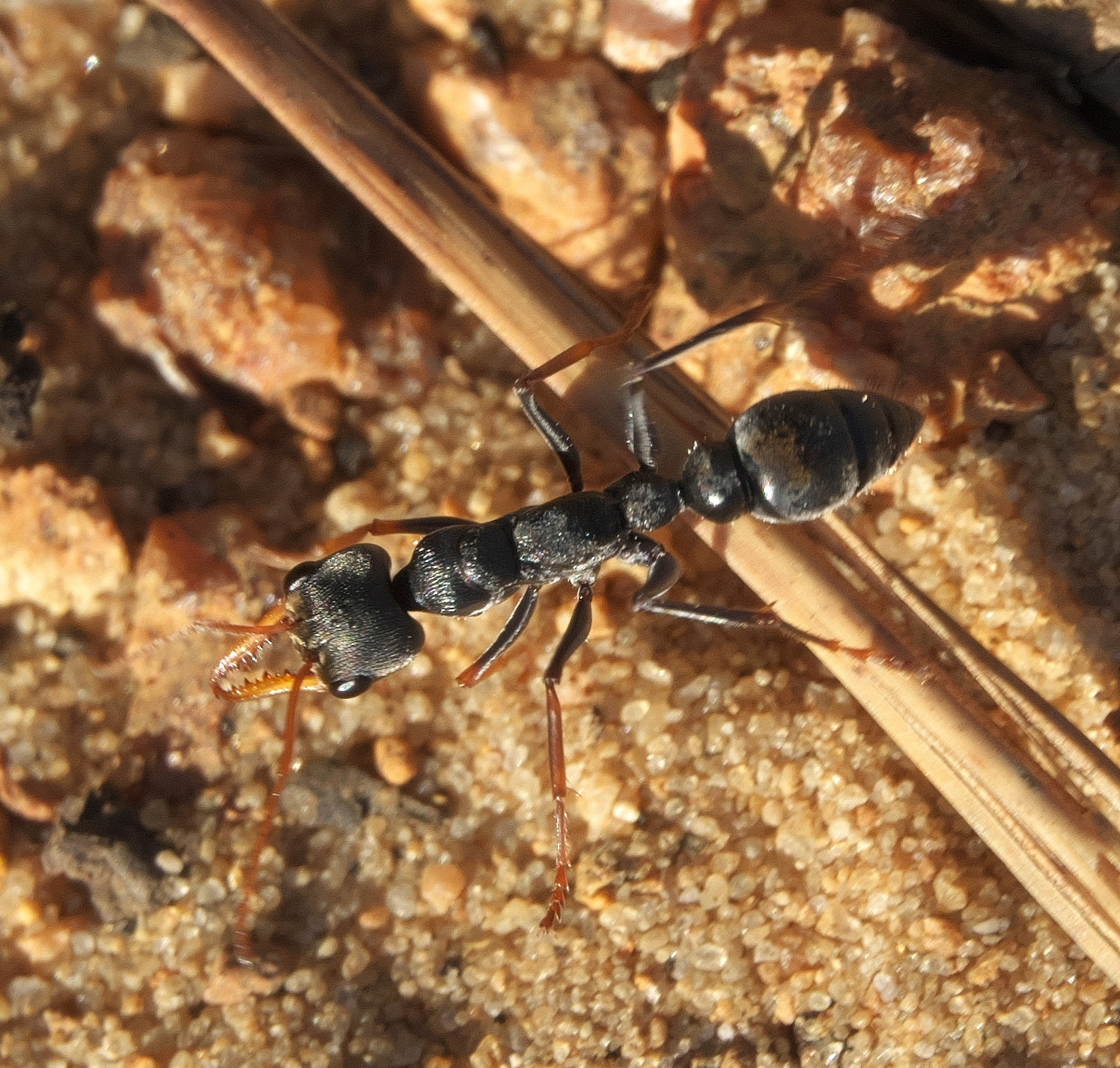
- Myrmecia imaii, Australia

Scientific classification
- Kingdom: Animalia
- Phylum: Arthropoda
- Clade: Pancrustacea
- Class: Insecta
- Order: Hymenoptera
- Family: Formicidae
- Subfamily: Myrmeciinae
- Genus: Myrmecia
- Species: M. imaii

Binomial name
- Myrmecia imaii Taylor, 2015

= Myrmecia imaii =

Species of ant endemic to Australia

Myrmecia imaii is a species of ant in the genus Myrmecia. Described by Robert Taylor in 2015, the species is endemic to Australia in Western Australia, particularly in very south-western areas.
