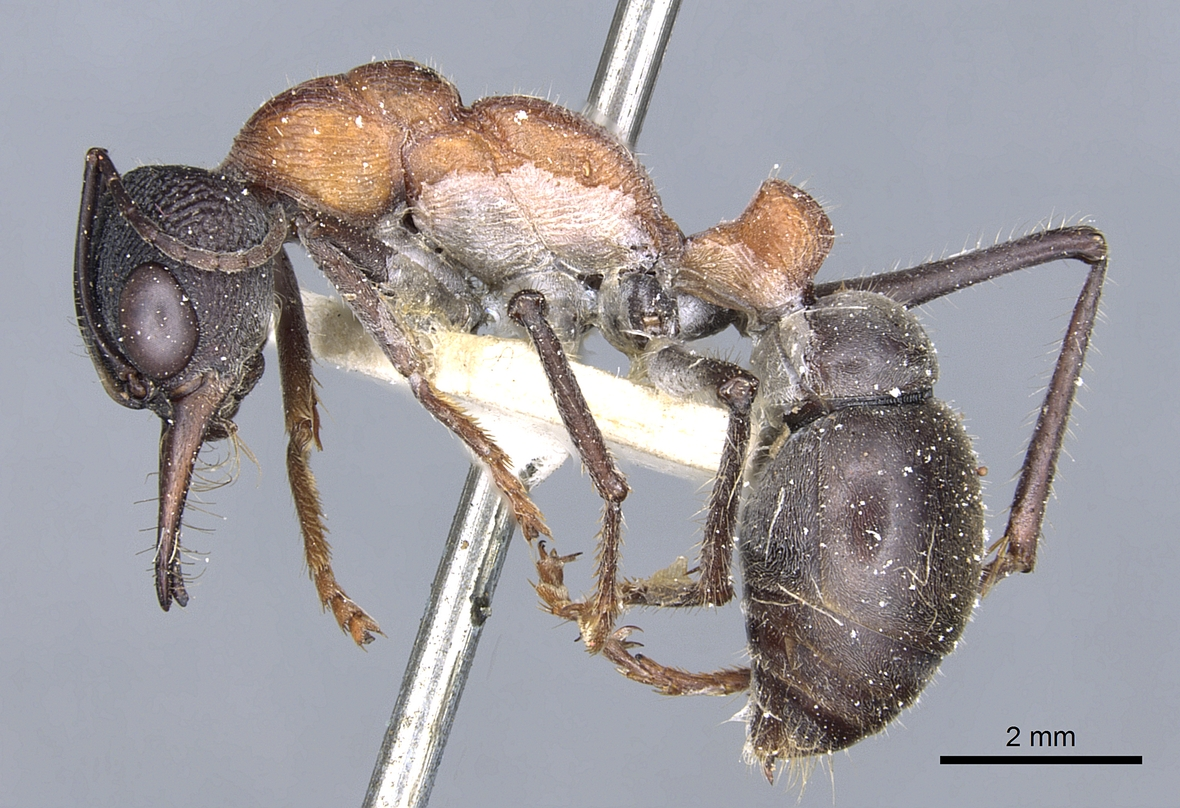

Scientific classification
- Kingdom: Animalia
- Phylum: Arthropoda
- Class: Insecta
- Order: Hymenoptera
- Family: Formicidae
- Subfamily: Myrmeciinae
- Genus: Myrmecia
- Species: M. ludlowi

Binomial name
- Myrmecia ludlowi Crawley, 1922

= Myrmecia ludlowi =

Species of ant

Myrmecia ludlowi is an Australian ant which belongs to the genus Myrmecia. This species is native to Australia and is commonly distributed in Western Australia. They were first described by Crawley in 1922.

Workers are around 12-15 millimetres long, queens are 22 millimetres and males are only 14 millimetres. Their jaws, antennae, and legs are of a brownish colour while their head and thorax are of a black colour.
