= Myrmecia banksi =

Scientific classification
- Kingdom: Animalia
- Phylum: Arthropoda
- Clade: Pancrustacea
- Class: Insecta
- Order: Hymenoptera
- Family: Formicidae
- Subfamily: Myrmeciinae
- Genus: Myrmecia
- Species: M. banksi

Binomial name
- Myrmecia banksi Taylor, 2015

Species of ant endemic to Australia

Myrmecia banksi is a species of jack-jumper ant in the genus Myrmecia. Described by Robert Taylor in 2015, the species is endemic to New South Wales in Australia in where it is normally found at low elevations along coastal regions.

== Morphology ==
The worker ants are approximately 11.8-13.5mm in length with a chocolate brown body. The jaws, antennae, and the apical third of the legs are reddish orange. M. banksi is distinguished from similar species by the greenish-gold hue of its head.

== Discovery and taxonomy ==
M. banksi is a member of the Myrmecia pilosula species complex. It is sometimes referred to as the "greenhead" form of M. pilosa. The name M. banksi has been used informally since the 1990s, however the species was not officially described until 2015. M. banksi was named for the entomologist Sir Joseph Banks who collected Australian ants near M. banksi's type locality.

== Scientific studies ==
=== Venom ===
Myrmecia banski defends itself with a venomous sting which causes significant pain to humans and can cause fatal anaphylaxis in some individuals. Components of the venom have hemolytic, cytotoxic, and allergenic properties. The venom also contains two peptides (pilosulin 3 and pilosulin 4) which demonstrate antimicrobial activity against many species of bacteria. Both peptides are similar to the peptide mellitin produced form the venom of the honey bee.

=== Karyology ===
M. banksi has 2n = 10 chromosomes. Karyology studies have suggested that M. banksi or a close ancestor may be one of the progenitors of the hybrid species Myrmedia impaternata.
