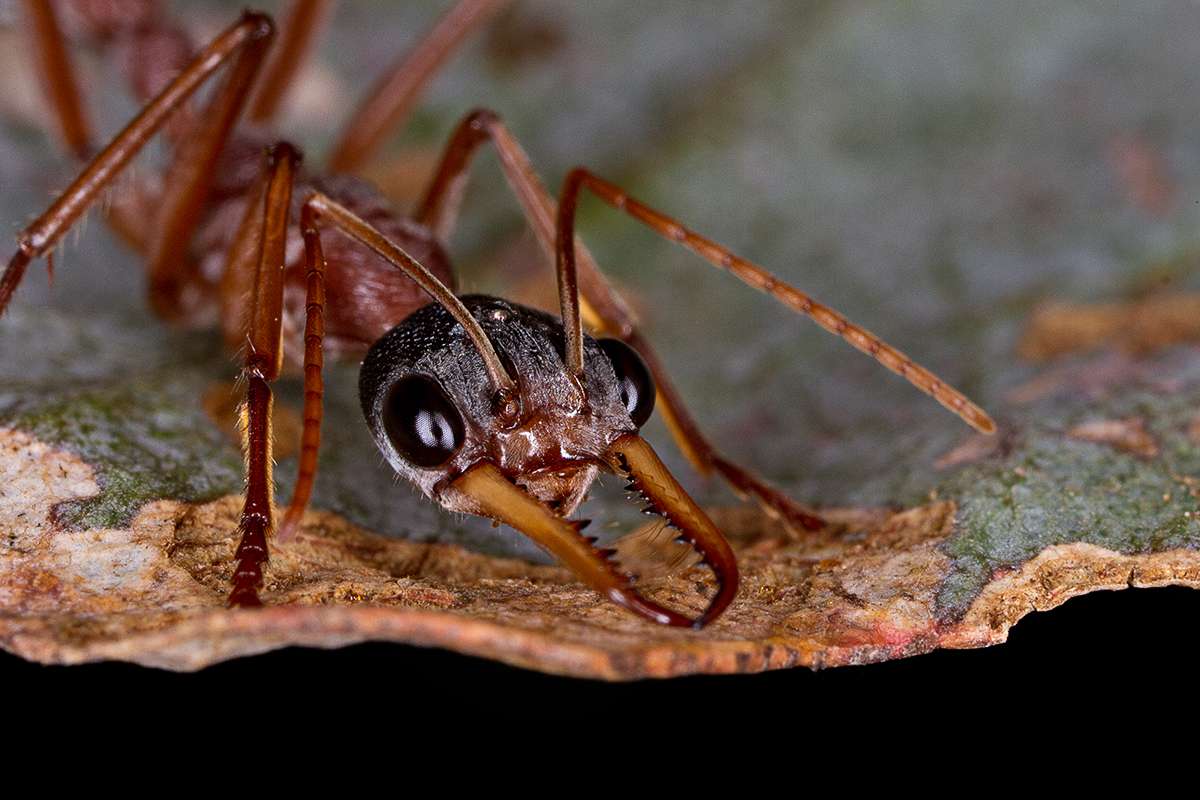
- Myrmecia nigriceps worker from Strangways, Victoria

Scientific classification
- Kingdom: Animalia
- Phylum: Arthropoda
- Clade: Pancrustacea
- Class: Insecta
- Order: Hymenoptera
- Family: Formicidae
- Subfamily: Myrmeciinae
- Genus: Myrmecia
- Species: M. nigriceps

Binomial name
- Myrmecia nigriceps Mayr, 1862

Synonyms
- Myrmecia fasciata (Clark, 1951)

= Myrmecia nigriceps =

Endemic ant species from Australia

Myrmecia nigriceps, also known as the black-headed bull ant, is a species of ant endemic to Australia. A member of the genus Myrmecia in the subfamily Myrmeciinae, it was first described by Austrian entomologist Gustav Mayr in 1862. These ants are large, varying from 19 to 23 millimetres (0.75 to 0.91 in) in length. However, colonies contain workers that are much smaller, usually half the size of normal workers. The queens are the largest while the males are the smallest, which can be easily identified due to their small mandibles.

Mainly nocturnal M. nigriceps is found in hot hilly areas and woodland, nesting underground in mounds. The ant's diet consists of sweet liquids from flowering plants and invertebrate prey, which are fed to the carnivorous larvae. Spiders are known to eat these ants, and echidnas consume the larvae and pupae. Like other Myrmecia species, M. nigriceps ants possess a powerful and painful sting, and the venom is capable of inducing allergic reactions in sensitive people.

== Taxonomy ==
First identified by Gustav Mayr in 1862, Mayr provided the first description of M. nigriceps in his journal Myrmecologische Studien. The species was described under the binomial name Myrmecia nigriceps, based on syntype workers collected from Gayndah and Sydney. In 1907, Swiss myrmecologist Auguste Forel treated M. nigriceps as a variant of M. vindex, but he eventually treated it as a synonym in 1910. M. nigriceps was revived as a full species in 1933 by American entomologist William Morton Wheeler, on the basis that it is distributed throughout Australia and its average size is greater than M. vindex. Scottish born Australian entomologist John S. Clark published one synonym – Myrmecia fasciata, now considered a junior synonym. M. nigriceps is a member of the genus Myrmecia, a part of the primitive subfamily Myrmeciinae; most ancestors of the genus are only found in fossils, with the exception of the dinosaur ant (Nothomyrmecia macrops).

Myrmecia nigriceps is a member of the M. gulosa species group, which is the largest species group of the nine groups described. The specific name, nigriceps, is a combination of the Latin words niger, meaning "black", and caput, meaning "head". This references the distinctive black head of the ant. With this said, M. nigriceps is commonly known as the black-headed bull ant.

== Description ==
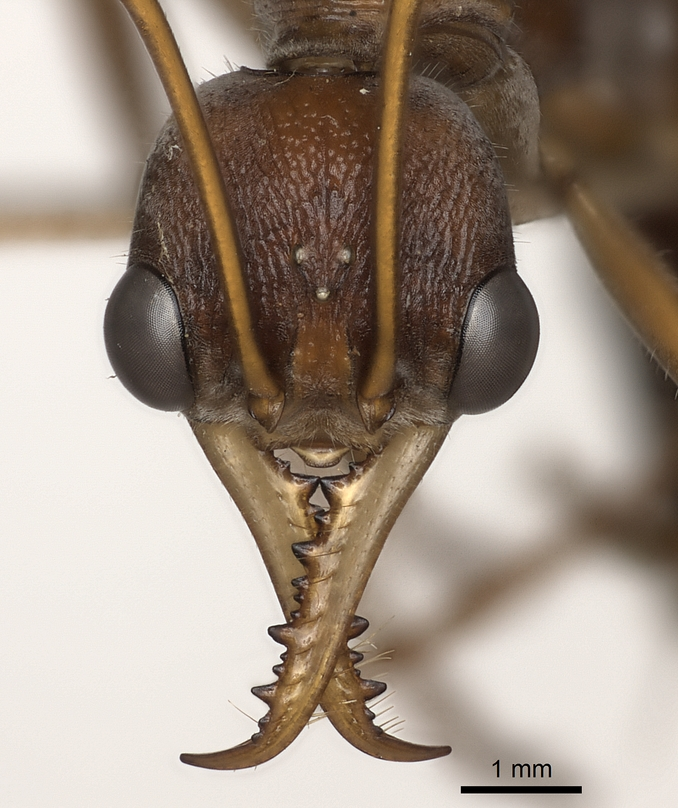
Front view

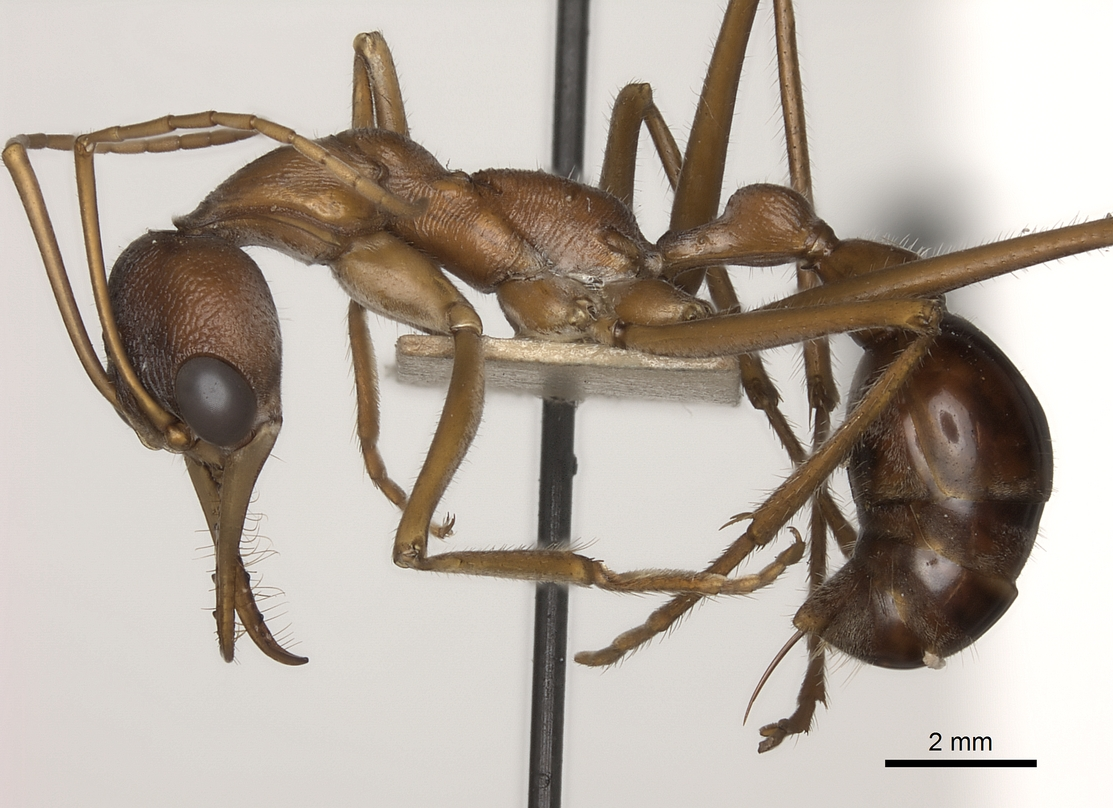
Side view

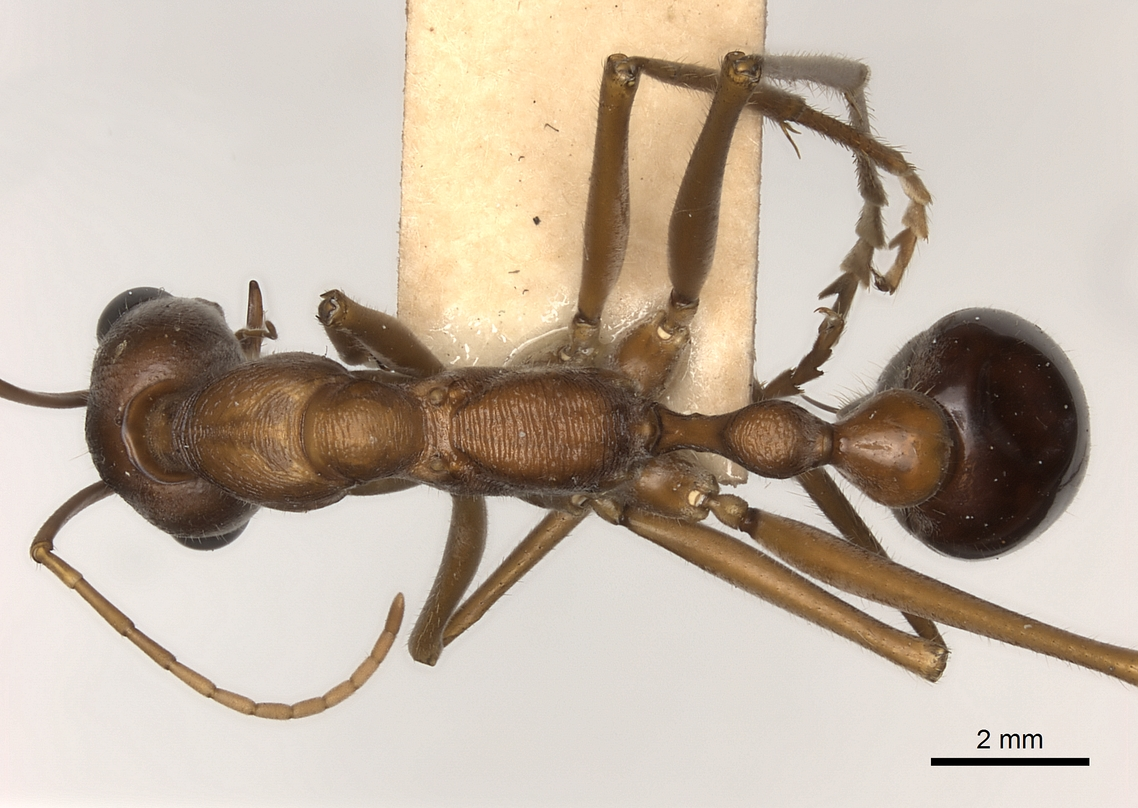
Top view

The size of worker ants varies from 19 to 23 millimetres (0.75 to 0.91 in). However, colonies contain very small workers, usually less than half the size of normal sized workers. Despite this, it is not known if M. nigriceps is polymorphic, due to little differences in morphology between the workers in comparison to Formicinae ants and Pheidole, with soldiers having enormous heads. The queens are the largest, measuring around 24 to 26 millimetres (0.94 to 1.02 in), and males being around similar sizes to worker ants at 18 to 20 millimetres (0.71 to 0.79 in). The head and gaster are black, and the thorax, node, and postpetiole are either red or yellowish red, while the antennae and legs are either yellow or testaceous. The mandibles and clypeus are also yellow. The hair is short and yellow in colour, erect on the body and suberect on the legs. The pubescence (short, fine, soft hair) is white and abundant all over the postpetiole and gaster. The head is almost as broad as its total length, and the mandibles are longer than the head with 13 teeth present.

The queen is similar in appearance to the worker, but they are the largest members of the colony. The hair is more abundant, and the head is broader. The mandibles are shorter and broader, although they are still as long as the head. The wings are yellowish in colour and translucent in appearance. Males are the smallest members of the colony and can be easily identifiable by their perceptibly smaller mandibles. The hairs on males are the longest and most abundant among the worker and queen castes, with a long and broad head.

Myrmecia nigriceps is similar in appearance to M. vindex, but several morphological characters distinguish these two species from each other. For example, M. nigriceps is generally larger than M. vindex, and its head is either black or dark brown; the head is broader and more rectangular in workers. The thorax and pedicel are noticeably darker and brownish red. The nests and behaviour, however, of both ants are similar to each other.

== Distribution and habitat ==
Myrmecia nigriceps is distributed throughout Australia, but the ant is absent from areas in central Australia and the northern Australian coast. The range of M. nigriceps extends from Queensland and down into New South Wales, the Australian Capital Territory and Victoria. It is also found in South Australia and Western Australia. Colonies are found in deserts, coastal areas, plateaus, woodland, native vegetation, hot hilly areas covered with scrubby vegetation and in rehabilitated sites, at elevations ranging from 300 to 460 metres (1,000 to 1,500 ft).

Myrmecia nigriceps is a mound constructing species, although colonies can be found under logs. Workers decorate the nest with a variety of items, including lateritic pebbles and soil crumbs, in a similar fashion of meat ant (Iridomyrmex purpureus) nests. Other items used for nest decorating include small stones and plant material.

== Behaviour and ecology ==
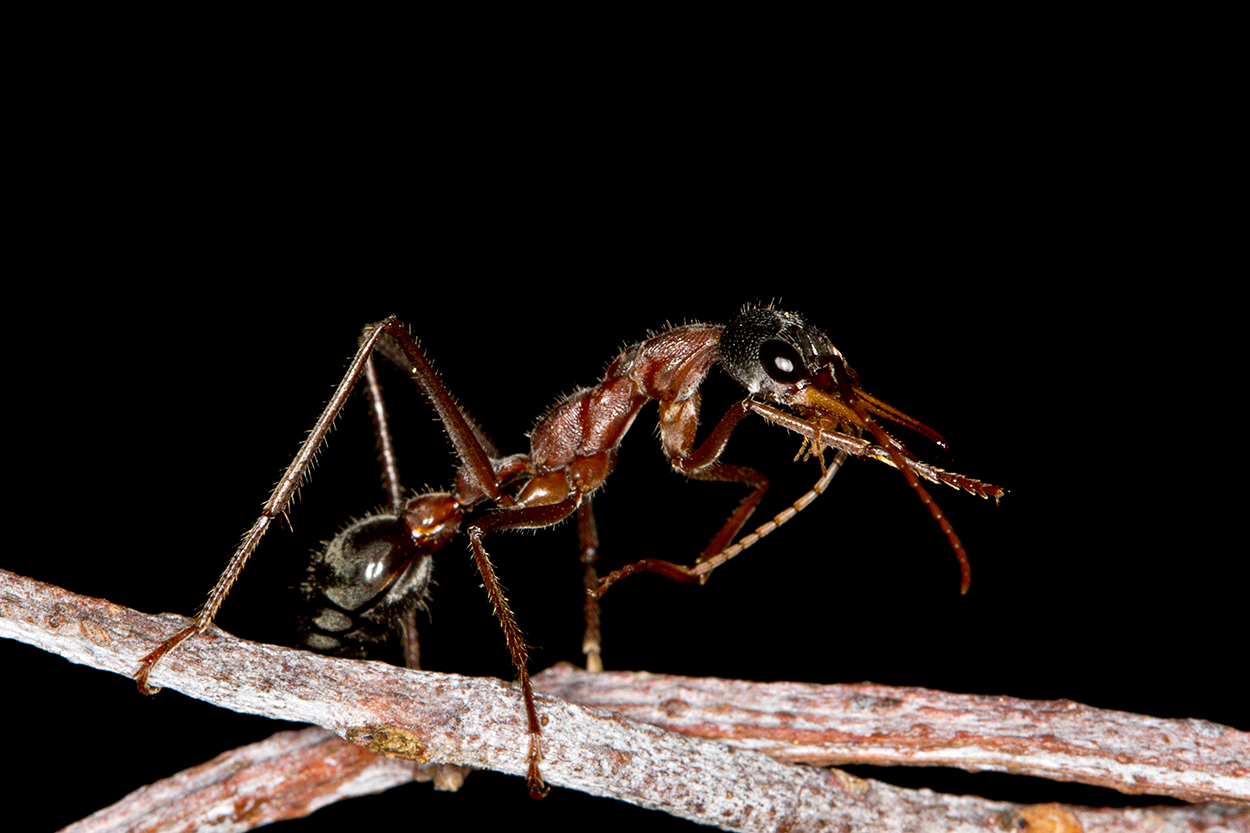
Worker grooming herself

Myrmecia nigriceps ants are crepuscular and nocturnal foragers, searching for food during the night. Workers are found foraging on Eucalyptus trees and is sympatric with many species. Adults are nectarivores, feeding on sweet liquids from plants and the larvae are carnivorous, feeding on captured invertebrates and other ants such as Camponotus workers and males. Cockroaches, such as Platyzosteria castanea and Platyzosteria ruficeps, can repel attacks by M. nigriceps by discharging a secretion that disorientates the attacking workers. Workers begin to forage one hour before sunset, with peak activity occurring during the twilight hours. These ants have excellent vision, having the largest eye lenses and photoreceptors than any other Myrmecia ant. These ants are capable of discriminating the distance and size of objects moving nearly a metre away, sensitive to motion and will rapidly charge towards any moving objects to attack it.

These ants are preyed on by the short-beaked echidna (Tachyglossus aculeatus), and by spiders in the genus Zenodorus, particularly Zenodorus metallescens. Blindsnakes are known to consume the larvae and pupae of these ants. Colonies are also a host for M. inquilina, a social parasite that lays its eggs inside the colony.

Myrmecia nigriceps is an extremely aggressive ant, and larger colonies may rival other colonies of a different Myrmecia species (such as M. gulosa) in terms of fierceness and pugnacity. While the mandibles cause little to no pain in humans, the ant is equipped with a painful and powerful sting that is found at the end of the gaster. Like other ants, the sting is not barbed, and workers are able to sting multiple times without injuring themselves. With a median lethal dose (LD_{50}) of 7.3 mg/kg, the venom is relatively weak in comparison to other Myrmecia ants, whose LD_{50} is much lower. (Note: Some tested Myrmecia species have an LD_{50} value of 0.18–0.35 mg/kg.) However, in a 2011 study, at least one patient had an allergic reaction to M. nigriceps venom. This study also concluded that many other Myrmecia species can cause anaphylaxis, as well as the Green-head ant (Rhytidoponera metallica). In the Starr sting pain scale, a scale which compares the overall pain of hymenopteran stings on a four-point scale, the sting of M. nigriceps was ranked as two in pain, described as "painful". M. nigriceps ants are able to enter colonies they do not reside in without being attacked; this may be due to these ants failing to recognise foreigners, or the consequences of ignoring workers from other colonies is low.

Nuptial flight occurs after rain for several days, taking place between December and March. The males and virgin queens emerge from their nest, and unlike other species who mate on the ground or climb onto nearby trees or branches to fly off from, the reproductive alates will fly from the nest. Recorded nuptial flights usually took place on hilltops. M. nigriceps queens are not known to seal up their entrance during colony foundation, unlike other Myrmecia species such as M. regularis. Workers can live exceptionally long, with an average lifespan of 2.2 years; maximum longevity in workers varied from 2.1 to 2.4 years.

== See also ==
- List of Myrmecia species
- List of ants of Australia
