= Myrmecia inquilina =

Conservation status
- Vulnerable (IUCN 2.3)

Scientific classification
- Kingdom: Animalia
- Phylum: Arthropoda
- Clade: Pancrustacea
- Class: Insecta
- Order: Hymenoptera
- Family: Formicidae
- Subfamily: Myrmeciinae
- Genus: Myrmecia
- Species: M. inquilina

Binomial name
- Myrmecia inquilina Douglas & Brown, 1959

Species of ant

Myrmecia inquilina is a species of ant endemic to Australia in the subfamily Myrmeciinae, first discovered in 1955 and described by Athol Douglas and William Brown Jr. in 1959. These ants are large, measuring 21.4 millimetres (0.84 in). During the time of its discovery, Douglas and Brown announced M. inquilina as the first social parasite among the primitive subfamilies, and today it is one of the two known Myrmecia species to have no worker caste. Two host species are known, Myrmecia nigriceps and Myrmecia vindex. Aggression between M. inquilina and its host species does not occur, and colonies may only produce M. inquilina brood months after the inquiline queens begin to lay their eggs. Queens eat the colony brood or trophic eggs, and other Myrmecia species may kill M. inquilina queens if they reject them. Due to its restricted distribution and threats to its habitat, the ant is "vulnerable" according to the IUCN Red List.

== Taxonomy ==
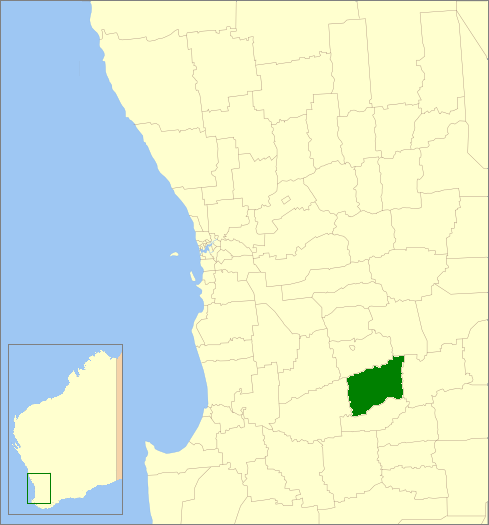
Location of Wagin

Before the discovery of M. inquilina, scientists believed that parasitic ants did not exist in the primitive ant subfamilies and were only known in Dolichoderinae, Formicinae and Myrmicinae; many authors believed that primitive ants lacked a certain trait that would prevent parasitic ants from forming, but the discovery of M. inquilina now hints possible parasitic lifeforms in Ponerinae and some army ants. Brown collected the first specimens in 1955 from large fallen trees in Western Australia, and it was officially announced as the first parasitic ant among the primitive subfamilies in 1956. In 1959, Australian naturalist Athol Douglas and American entomologist William Brown Jr. provided the first description of the ant in an Insectes Sociaux journal article. Its specific epithet inquilina derives from the word inquilinus, meaning "tenant". This name references the parasitic nature of the species, living inside a colony as a "guest" of another species.

Brown discovered the holotype female from an M. vindex nest on 23 March 1955 northwest from Wagin at Badjanning Rocks, Western Australia. The specimen is currently housed in the Western Australian Museum in Perth. Two dealated paratype females were also collected with the holotype, looking very similar to each other except for the mandibles and colouration. The mandibular dentition varies among the three, and one of the paratypes is darker than the holotype. In 1991, a published journal reviewing the species groups assigned M. inquilina to the M. cephalotes species group. However, entomologists placed it in the M. gulosa species group one month after placing it in the M. cephalotes species group.

== Description ==
Myrmecia inquilina is a large species, though it is smaller than its host. The body length of the ant is 21.4 millimetres (0.84 in), the head including the clypeus is 2.9 millimetres (0.11 in), the antennal scape 3.5 millimetres (0.14 in) and the diameter of the eyes are 1.25 millimetres (0.05 in). The mandibles are slender with four to five acutely shaped teeth. The antennae are morphologically similar to M. vindex, but it is smaller in comparison; the petiole node is also longer and wider. The postpetiole is subtriangular and more narrow than those seen on M. vindex queens. The clypeus, legs and antennae are covered in punctulates (spots), and the postpetiole and gaster have less punctulates. M. inquilina can be distinguished from other ants due to its lack of pilose (long soft hairs); only small erect setae are mostly found on the mandibles and gastric apex, but short hair can be found on the legs, and on the dorsum, thorax and cervix. The ant has pubescence (soft short hair) finer and more abundant than M. vindex. The pubescence is greyish in colour, and it is shorter and more noticeable on the clypeus and appendages while it is conspicuous on the postpetiole and gaster.

The colour of the head and gaster are black, shading into reddish brown on the clypeus and around the frontal carinae. The mesosoma (alitrunk), node, and legs are brownish-red and light, with the legs becoming yellowish in certain areas. The antennae and mandibles are brownish yellow, and the teeth have black edges. Overall, M. inquilina can be distinguished from others by its black head and its almost hairless body. Its colour is similar to M. nigriceps, but M. nigriceps is larger and covered in hair, along with a head more rounded than other species. M. inquilina does not have a worker caste, making it a workerless parasite.

Five males collected from an M. vindex nest are presumed to be M. inquilina, but the similarities between the two species cannot confirm if the males are M. inquilina. While the males collected are morphologically similar to M. vindex males, the head and gaster are darker, and two specimens show a reddish-brown colour at the base of the first gastric segment, a characteristic that does not occur in M. vindex males. The genitalia is similar, but a more detailed study can distinguish these features among the two ants.

== Distribution and habitat ==
Myrmecia inquilina is only found in the south-west of Western Australia, with the holotype collected 225 kilometres (140 miles) from Perth. M. inquilina occurs in colonies with M. vindex and M. nigriceps, found in soil, under logs and flat rocks in woodland. They are commonly found in granite outcrops and wooded areas, with trees such as Corymbia calophylla, Acacia acuminata and a large unidentified species of Allocasuarina (possibly Allocasuarina huegeliana) present. The type locality was in an area cleared for agricultural purposes, but some areas were still wooded; many fallen large trees were present. M. inquilina is typically found deep inside the nests, around 25 centimetres (10 inches) and can be found next to the queen.

== Behaviour and ecology ==
Myrmecia inquilina is one of the two known Myrmecia species to not have a worker caste, and it is an inquiline to M. nigriceps and M. vindex colonies. M. inquilina is a polygynous species; colonies can house between two and several dozen queens, but some of them nesting in the colony are originally from there. Due to this, some M. inquilina females are ergatoid ants that lose their wings after eclosing in their cocoons. The parasitic queen(s) may only coexist indefinitely, but M. inquilina queens replace all host brood with their own eggs several months after infiltrating the nest. This only occurs if M. inquilina queens eat or destroy the brood laid by their host, and workers will even tend to the brood and protect it from potential invaders. M. inquilina queens tend to nest near the host queen and her brood, attended by worker ants without any form of aggression. Observations suggest that parasitic queens feed on trophic eggs laid by workers. Predatory threats only include other Myrmecia species; they are rejected by a potential host colony. For example, M. regularis workers immediately seize M. inquilina queens and kill it as soon as the two species come into contact.

Aerial dispersion is important in this species, despite its restricted distribution. Queens never forage outside or leave the nest, unless under severe deprivation. Before nuptial flight, fully developed females start to occur during summer. Between 9 and 10 pm in January, queens and males start to emerge from their host nest and begin to mate. Observations show that the alates will climb up onto objects such as lighted fluorescent lamps and begin to fly after half an hour of endless running. When queens are looking for a host nest or wandering openly, M. vindex foragers may identify a queen and seize her; such behaviour suggests that workers actively recruit fertilised queens for their nest. Host colonies tend to be smaller and depauperated when compared to other colonies without any inquiline queens, but host colonies can still produce alate offspring.

== Status ==
Myrmecia inquilina is the only species in its genus to be listed as "vulnerable" by the IUCN Red List. This, however, needs updating. Habitat loss may be responsible for the ant to be potentially endangered; Douglas and Brown note that a contamination of dieldrin spray to control the argentine ant destroyed many nests housing M. inquilina, and burn-offs are also a threat to colonies housing M. inquilina.
