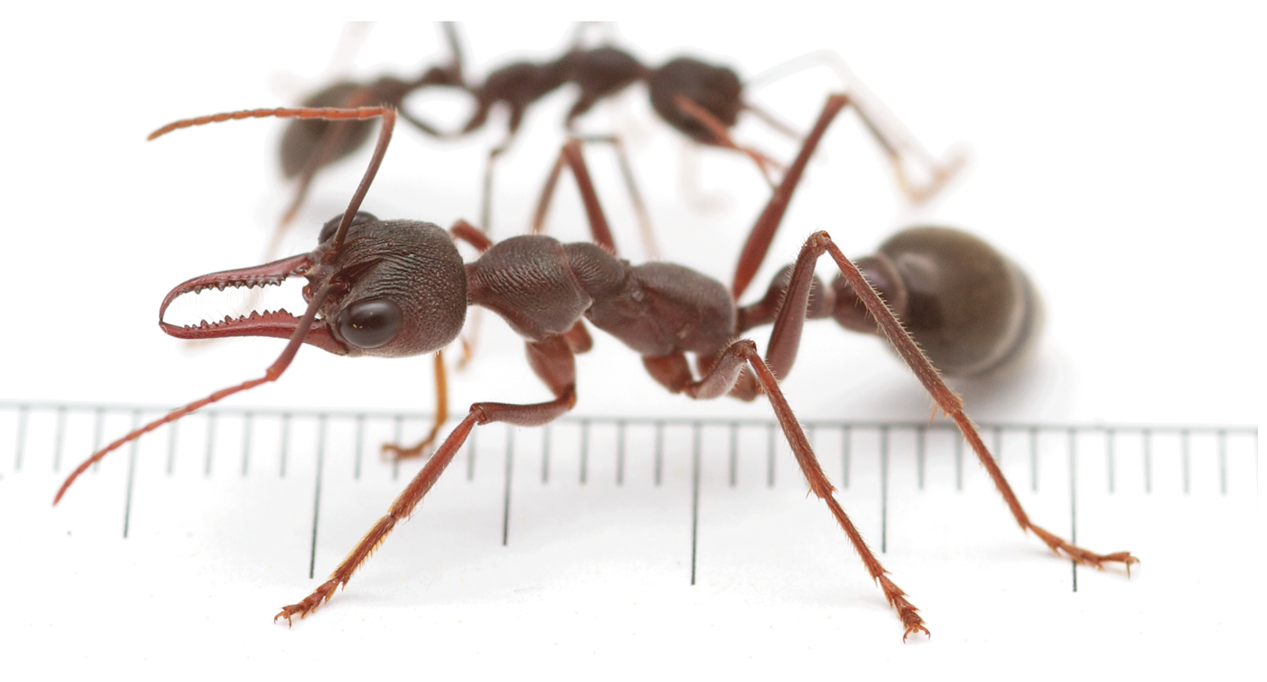

Scientific classification
- Kingdom: Animalia
- Phylum: Arthropoda
- Clade: Pancrustacea
- Class: Insecta
- Order: Hymenoptera
- Family: Formicidae
- Subfamily: Myrmeciinae
- Genus: Myrmecia
- Species: M. pyriformis

Binomial name
- Myrmecia pyriformis Smith, 1858

Synonyms
- Myrmecia sanguinea Smith, 1858

= Myrmecia pyriformis =

Species of ant

Myrmecia pyriformis, also known as the bull ant or inch ant, is an Australian ant. Myrmecia pyriformis belongs to the genus Myrmecia. It is abundant in many major cities of Australia, but mostly spotted in the eastern states. The species is of a similar appearance to the Myrmecia forficata.

Sizes of the Myrmecia pyriformis range around 14–23 millimetres (0.55–0.91 inches) long. Female workers can grow as large as 26 millimetres (1.0 inch) while males only grow to 18–20 millimetres (0.71–0.79 inches) long. Mandibles and most other features are dark red. Thoraxes are sometimes blackish-brown.

Myrmecia pyriformis is known to survive without a queen. While some species of Myrmecia possess the gamergates, the female workers of Myrmecia pyriformis are also able to reproduce. A colony of the genus was collected in 1998 without a queen, but the colony continued producing workers for the next three years.

Guinness World Records listed Myrmecia pyriformis as the world's most dangerous ant.

== Taxonomy ==
Myrmecia pyriformis was first described by British entomologist Frederick Smith in his 1858 publication Catalogue of hymenopterous insects in the collection of the British Museum part VI, based on a syntype worker, queen and male collected from Melbourne and the Hunter River. The specimens are currently housed in Natural History Museum in London. Smith notes that M. pyriformis is very similar in appearance to M. forficata, though he comments all sexes are larger, the male is strikingly distinct and the head is more square shaped and not narrowed from the back end. Smith also described M. sanguinea from Tasmania in the same publication he described M. pyriformis, now treated as a junior synonym. Prior to this, however, M. sanguinea was thought to be a synonym of M. vindex. Due to its similar appearance to M. forficata, Auguste Forel believed M. pyriformis was a subspecies, rather than a full species. M. pyriformis was never reassigned as a subspecies; instead, it is still regarded as a full species in the genus Myrmecia.

In 1911, Carlo Emery established seven species groups, placing M. pyriformis in the M. forficata species group. This placement was long accepted until a 1991 review of the species groups was published and moved the species to the M. cephalotes species group instead. This placement, however, was short lived and the ant was placed in the M. gulosa species group one month after it was placed in the M. cephalotes species group. M. pyriformis is commonly known as the black bull-ant, brown bulldog ant or the inch ant, which references the colour and notably large size of the ant.

== Description ==
Myrmecia pyriformis is similar to M. forficata, but there are several characteristics that can distinguish the two species from each other. M. pyriformis is typically larger, the colour is darker and the head and alitrunk (a segment of the body where the wings are attached) are either dark reddish-brown or blackish-brown. The mandibles are broader, the clypeus is covered in hair and the postpetiole bears very short hair that are either greyish or brown.
