= Myrmecia maxima =

Scientific classification
- Kingdom: Animalia
- Phylum: Arthropoda
- Clade: Pancrustacea
- Class: Insecta
- Order: Hymenoptera
- Family: Formicidae
- Subfamily: Myrmeciinae
- Genus: Myrmecia
- Species: M. maxima

Binomial name
- Myrmecia maxima Moore, 1842

Species of ant endemic to Australia

Myrmecia maxima is an unidentifiable species of ant endemic to Australia. A member of the genus Myrmecia in the subfamily Myrmeciinae, M. maxima was first described by George Fletcher Moore in 1842. As no type specimen is available, M. maxima cannot be confidently identified, but the only description Moore had provided undoubtedly describes a large Myrmecia species, having long, sharp mandibles and a formidable sting. It is not classified as a valid species. The ant resides in the south-west regions of Western Australia. As other Myrmecia species have been identified in these regions, M. maxima is possibly a senior synonym of one of these ants. Its former name is recognised as an invalid name after it was suppressed under plenary powers in 1976.

== Distribution and identity ==
Like almost all Myrmecia species, M. maxima is endemic to Australia. Specifically, the ant lives in the south-west of Western Australia, where other Myrmecia species are known to reside. This includes Myrmecia nigriceps, Myrmecia regularis and Myrmecia vindex. As no type specimen is available, it is difficult to properly identify the species. However, Moore describes the ant in his publication as being one and a half inches long (3.8 centimetres), having very long and sharp mandibles and a formidable sting that produces acute pain. These morphological characteristics (large size, long mandibles and powerful stings) is consistent with most Myrmecia species which are well known ants.

== Taxonomy and background ==
Before Myrmecia maxima was described, George Fletcher Moore had an interest in the language of the Aborigines and learned it. Shortly after his arrival, he commenced a project to produce a dictionary of the Aboriginal language. Notable figures such as Francis Armstrong, Charles Symmons, John Gilbert and John Hutt, the Governor of Western Australia, helped Moore by assisting him with the vocabulary or helped fund his book. Moore took extended leave in March 1841, returning to England for two years. In 1842, Moore's dictionary was published under the title A Descriptive Vocabulary of the Language in Common Use Amongst the Aborigines of Western Australia. In his book, Moore provided the first official description of M. maxima, which was known as kallili or killal amongst the Nyungar people of Western Australia and referred to by Moore as a "lion-ant". There, the ant was originally placed in the genus Formica. The description Moore had provided undoubtedly describes a large Myrmecia species, and so it was reclassified by entomologists William Ride and Robert W. Taylor in 1973, and the ant was now known as M. maxima. Under the present classification, M. maxima is a member of the subfamily Myrmeciinae. This subfamily is a member of the family Formicidae, belonging to the order Hymenoptera. As Moore collected no type specimen, M. maxima cannot be properly identified or be placed into any Myrmecia species group. Despite this, M. maxima is still treated as a valid species.

The name Formica maxima is only regarded in both editions of Moore's book and two publications written by Rosendo Salvado, a Spanish missionary. In these editions, only its name referred to by the Western Australian Aborigines was mentioned. Due to this and Moore's description that identifies an unknown Myrmecia ant, Taylor and Ride requested that the International Commission on Zoological Nomenclature (ICZN) should suppress the name in correlation with the Law of Priority and not the Law of Homonymy. They also proposed that the name should be added to the Index of Rejected and Invalid Specific Names and not be used as a valid name for M. maxima. By 1976, members of the ICZN voted in favour of suppressing the name under plenary powers.

If scientists managed to identify M. maxima and a neotype selected in relation to its geographical presence and the only known description provided, the ant may be a senior synonym of M. nigriceps, M. regularis or M. vindex. This is because the taxon name was described much earlier than the three species, and it would have priority in accordance to the International Code of Zoological Nomenclature. The taxon M. vindex basirufa was a candidate for neotype selection due to the misunderstood and troublesome taxonomic history of M. vindex and M. vindex basirufa, but this taxon was synonymised in 1991.
