= M. maxima =

M. maxima may refer to:

- Manilkara maxima, a plant endemic to Brazil
- Megaceryle maxima, an African kingfisher
- Megathyrsus maximus, a bunch grass
- Melanocorypha maxima, an Asian lark
- Mimusops maxima, an evergreen plant
- Mordella maxima, a tumbling flower beetle
- Mordellistena maxima, a tumbling flower beetle
- Myristica maxima, an Asian plant
- Myrmecia maxima, an Australian ant
