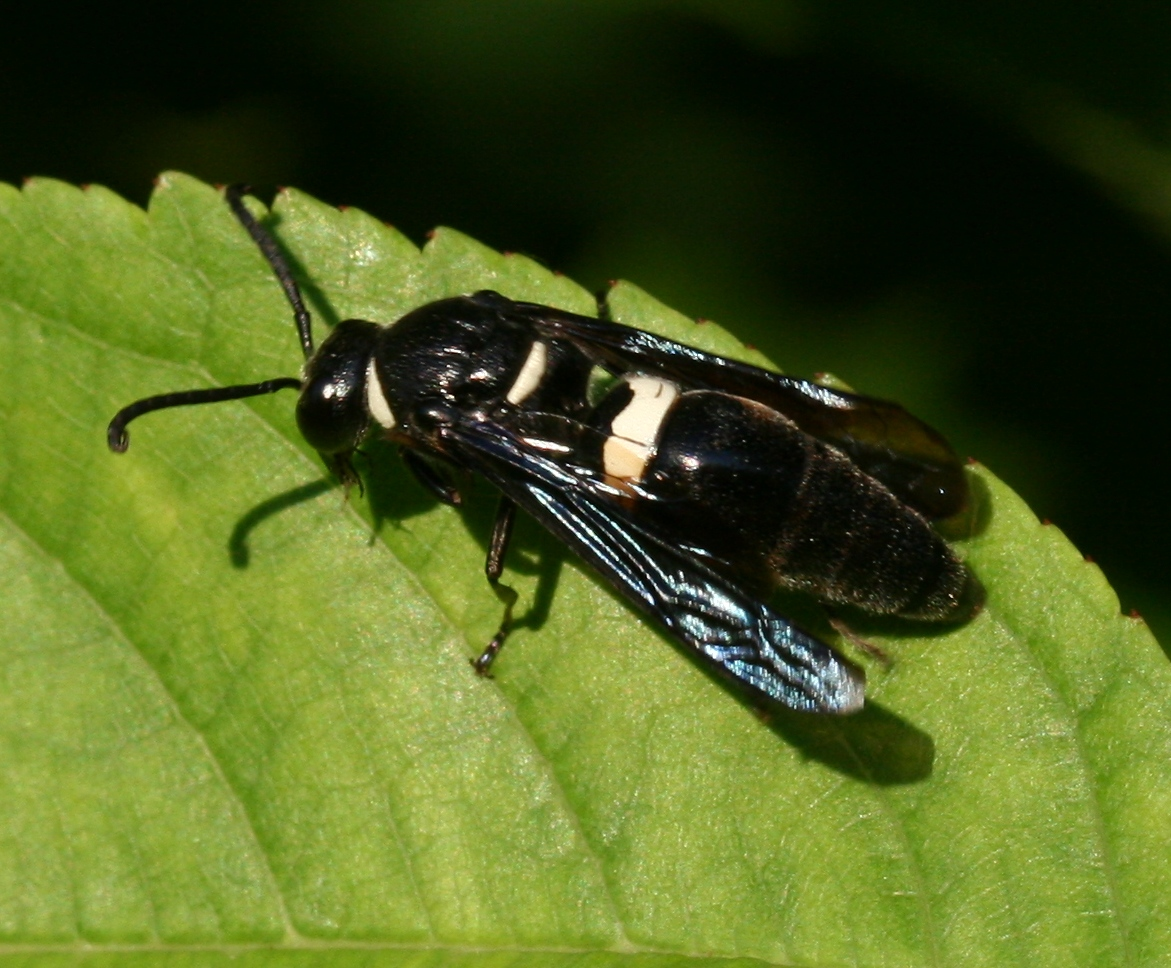

Scientific classification
- Kingdom: Animalia
- Phylum: Arthropoda
- Clade: Pancrustacea
- Class: Insecta
- Order: Hymenoptera
- Family: Vespidae
- Genus: Monobia
- Species: M. quadridens

Binomial name
- Monobia quadridens (Linnaeus, 1763)

Synonyms
- Vespa quadridens Linnaeus, 1763; Vespa cincta-nigra De Geer, 1773; Vespa uncinata Fabricius, 1775; Odynerus uncinatus (Fabricius, 1775)

= Monobia quadridens =

Species of wasp

Monobia quadridens, also known as the four-toothed mason wasp, is a species of solitary potter wasp (subfamily Eumeninae) found in North America. It grows to a wingspan of 18 mm (0.71 in), and feeds on small caterpillars and pollen. Two generations occur per year, with one generation overwintering as pupae.

== Description ==
Four-toothed mason wasps nectaring on Canadian thistle

The abdomen of M. quadridens is entirely black, except for a broad ivory-coloured band on the first tergite. The wingspan is typically 11.0–14.5 mm (0.43–0.57 in) for males, and 14–18 mm (0.55–0.71 in) for females. It closely resembles Euodynerus bidens in size and colouration.

== Distribution ==
Monobia quadridens has a wide distribution in eastern North America. In Mexico, it is found in the states of Tamaulipas and Nuevo León, while in the United States, it is found from New Mexico, Kansas, and Wisconsin east to the Eastern Seaboard. The occurrence of the species in Canada has been recorded by Buck (2008 https://cjai.biologicalsurvey.ca/bmc_05/pdf/bmc05.pdf) and specimens identified as M. quadridens have been present in Canadian entomological collections for a long time.

== Taxonomy ==
Monobia quadridens was first described by Carl Linnaeus in his 1763 work Centuria Insectorum, under the name Vespa quadridens.

== Life cycle and ecology ==
Monobia quadridens is bivoltine, having two generations in a year. One emerges in summer, while the other overwinters as pupae before emerging the following spring. Copulation lasts for 30 minutes in M. quadridens, while in most wasp species, it only lasts a minute or two. It nests in a variety of cavities including tunnels abandoned by carpenter bees, old nests built by mud daubers, and hollow plant stems.

The diet of M. quadridens is primarily composed of caterpillars of microlepidoptera, including species from the families Pyralidae, Crambidae, Elachistidae, Amphisbatidae, Gelechiidae, and Tortricidae. The diet also includes a large proportion of pollen.

== Sting ==
Like many wasps, M. quadridens is capable of delivering a sting. The pain caused by the sting of a female is similar to that caused by the bald-faced hornet or the ant Myrmecia nigriceps. Unlike most other wasps, however, the male is also capable of delivering a painful jab like a needle prick, although no venom is injected, so the pain is transient. The male has no stinger and uses the tip of its abdomen.
