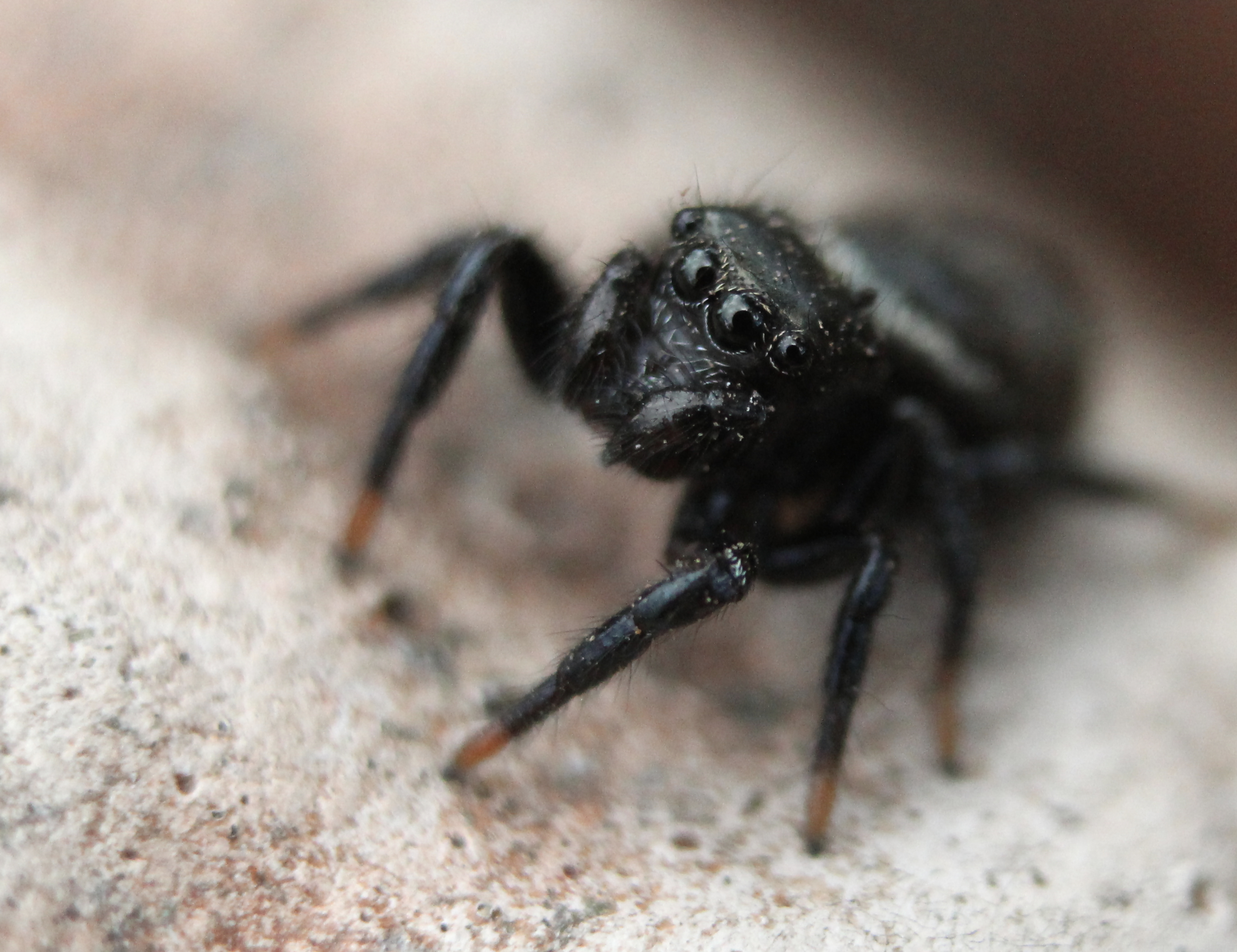
- Z. orbiculatus

Scientific classification
- Kingdom: Animalia
- Phylum: Arthropoda
- Subphylum: Chelicerata
- Class: Arachnida
- Order: Araneae
- Infraorder: Araneomorphae
- Family: Salticidae
- Subfamily: Salticinae
- Genus: Zenodorus; Peckham & Peckham, 1886

Type species
- Attus d'urvillii Walckenaer, 1837

Species
- See text

Diversity
- 23 species

Synonyms
- Mollika

= Zenodorus (spider) =

Genus of spiders

Zenodorus is a genus of the jumping spiders distributed from the Moluccas to Australia, including several islands of the Pacific. It was once considered a junior synonym of Omoedus, but this was later rejected by Jerzy Prószyński in 2017. At least one species, Z. orbiculatus, specializes on hunting ants.

Prószyński placed Zenodorus in his informal group "euophryines". When synonymized with Omoedus, it was placed in the large tribe Euophryini, part of the Salticoida clade of the subfamily Salticinae in Maddison's 2015 classification of the family Salticidae.

== Species ==
As of September 2020, the World Spider Catalog accepted the following species:

- Zenodorus albertisi (Thorell, 1881) — Moluccas to Queensland
- Zenodorus arcipluvii (Peckham & Peckham, 1901) — New Hebrides, Australia
- Zenodorus brevis (Zhang & Maddison, 2012) — New Guinea
- Zenodorus danae Hogg, 1915 — New Guinea
- Zenodorus darleyorum (Zhang & Maddison, 2012) — New Guinea
- Zenodorus durvillei (Walckenaer, 1837) — New Guinea, Australia
- Zenodorus formosus (Rainbow, 1899) — Solomon Islands
- Zenodorus jucundus (Rainbow, 1912) — Northern Territory
- Zenodorus juliae (Thorell, 1881) — New Guinea
- Zenodorus lepidus (Guérin, 1834) — New Guinea
- Zenodorus marginatus (Simon, 1902) — Queensland
- Zenodorus metallescens (L. Koch, 1879) — Queensland, New Guinea
- Zenodorus meyeri (Zhang & Maddison, 2012) — New Guinea
- Zenodorus microphthalmus (L. Koch, 1881) — Pacific Islands
- Zenodorus niger (Karsch, 1878) — New South Wales
- Zenodorus obscurofemoratus (Keyserling, 1883) — New South Wales
- Zenodorus omundseni (Zhang & Maddison, 2012) — New Guinea
- Zenodorus orbiculatus (Keyserling, 1881) — Queensland, New South Wales
- Zenodorus papuanus (Zhang & Maddison, 2012) — New Guinea
- Zenodorus ponapensis Berry, Beatty & Prószynski, 1996 — Caroline Islands
- Zenodorus pupulus (Thorell, 1881) — Queensland
- Zenodorus pusillus (Strand, 1913) — Samoa, Tahiti
- Zenodorus rhodopae Hogg, 1915 — New Guinea
- Zenodorus semirasus (Keyserling, 1882) — Queensland
- Zenodorus swiftorum (Zhang & Maddison, 2012) — New Guinea
- Zenodorus syrinx Hogg, 1915 — New Guinea
- Zenodorus tortuosus (Zhang & Maddison, 2012) — New Guinea
- Zenodorus variatus Pocock, 1899 — Solomon Islands
- Zenodorus varicans (Thorell, 1881) — Queensland
- Zenodorus wangillus Strand, 1911 — Aru Islands
