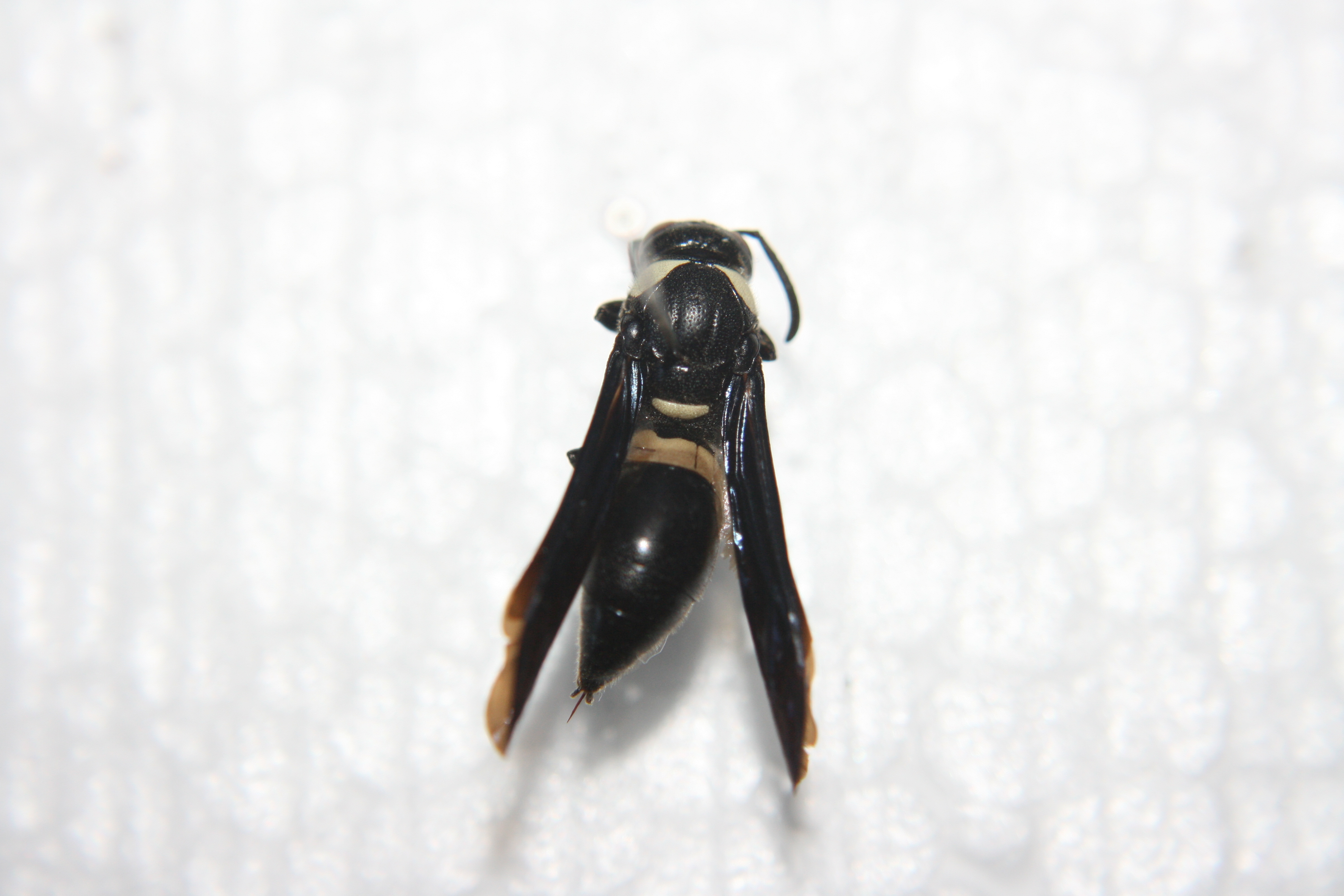
- Monobia quadridens

Scientific classification
- Domain: Eukaryota
- Kingdom: Animalia
- Phylum: Arthropoda
- Class: Insecta
- Order: Hymenoptera
- Family: Vespidae
- Subfamily: Eumeninae
- Genus: Monobia; Saussure, 1852

Type species
- Vespa quadridens Carl Linnaeus, 1763

Species
- See text

= Monobia =

Genus of wasps

Monobia is a primarily neotropical genus of medium-sized to large potter wasps occurring from the United States to Argentina. This genus is very closely related to the genus Montezumia. It contains the following species:

- Monobia angulosa Saussure, 1852
- Monobia anomala Saussure, 1852
- Monobia apicalipennis Saussure, 1852
- Monobia atrorubra Ducke, 1904
- Monobia biangulata Saussure, 1875
- Monobia californica (Saussure, 1863)
- Monobia caliginosa Willink, 1982
- Monobia carbonaria Willink, 1982
- Monobia caridei Brèthes, 1906
- Monobia cingulata Brèthes, 1903
- Monobia curvata Fox, 1899
- Monobia cyanipennis (Guerin, 1831)
- Monobia deplanata Ducke, 1908
- Monobia egregia Saussure, 1856
- Monobia eremna Willink, 1982
- Monobia funebris Gribodo, 1891
- Monobia incarum Bequard, 1940
- Monobia insueta Giordani Soika, 1969
- Monobia lecointei Ducke, 1911
- Monobia mochii Giordani Soika, 1973
- Monobia nayarit Willink, 1982
- Monobia nigripennis Saussure, 1875
- Monobia paraguayensis Berton, 1925
- Monobia proeta (Cresson, 1865)
- Monobia puertoricensis Bequard, 1941
- Monobia quadridens (Linnaeus, 1763)
- Monobia schrottkyi Berton, 1918
- Monobia scutellaris Ducke, 1911
- Monobia sylvatica Saussure, 1852
- Monobia texana (Cresson, 1872)
- Monobia trifasciata Willink, 1982
- Monobia yacochuyae Willink, 1982
