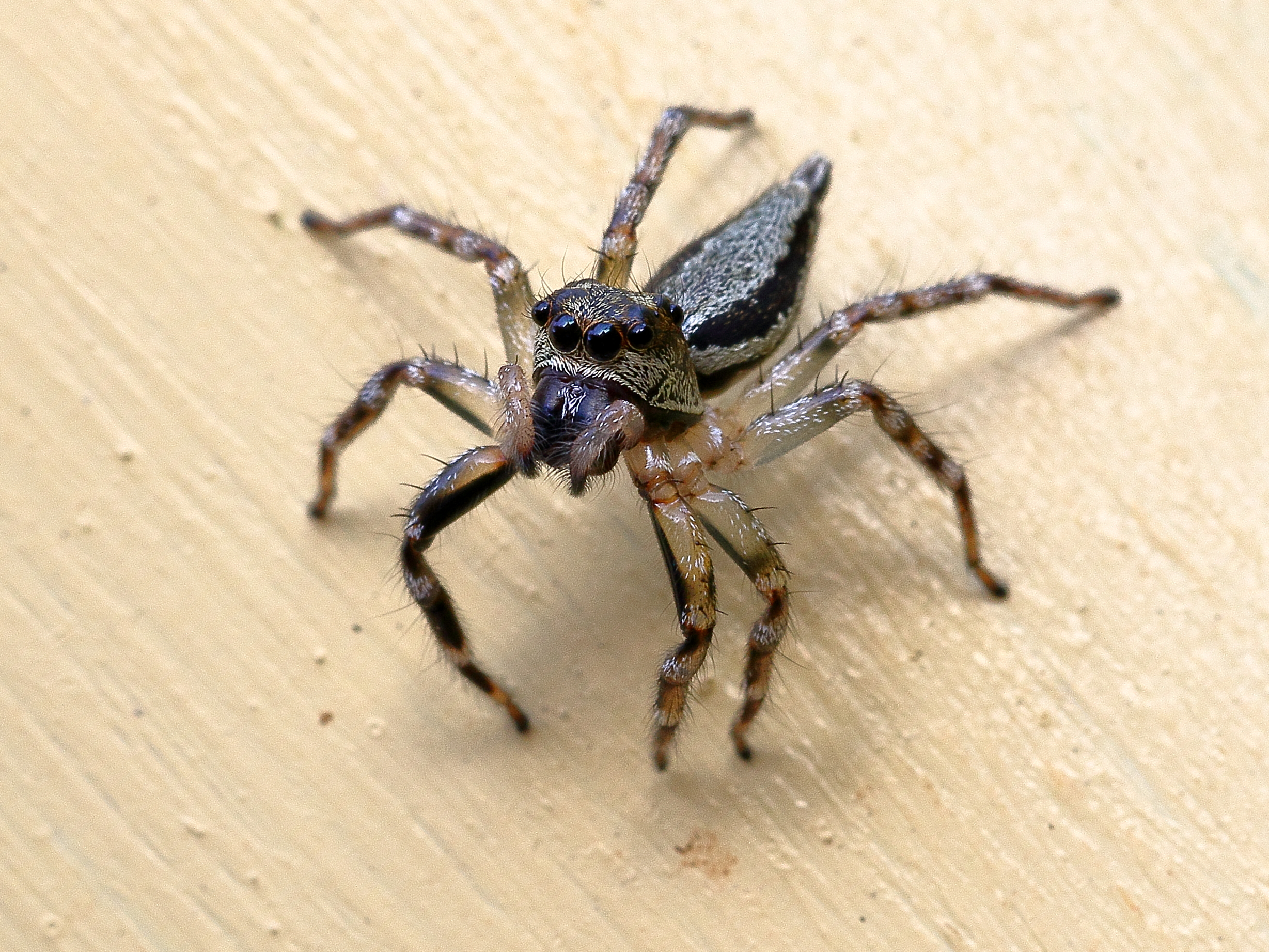
- Female

Scientific classification
- Kingdom: Animalia
- Phylum: Arthropoda
- Subphylum: Chelicerata
- Class: Arachnida
- Order: Araneae
- Infraorder: Araneomorphae
- Family: Salticidae
- Genus: Zenodorus
- Species: Z. swiftorum

Binomial name
- Zenodorus swiftorum (Zhang & Maddison, 2012)

Synonyms
- Omoedus swiftorum

= Zenodorus swiftorum =

Swifts' ant-hunter

Species of spider

Zenodorus swiftorum is a species of ant-hunting jumping spider found in Papua New Guinea and northern Australia. The common name is Swifts' ant-hunter, and was named in honour of Kristin Swift and John Swift who supported Conservation International in New Guinea. Zenodorus swiftorum is common but variable across tropical Australia and countries to the north. Females are slightly larger than males.

== Gallery ==
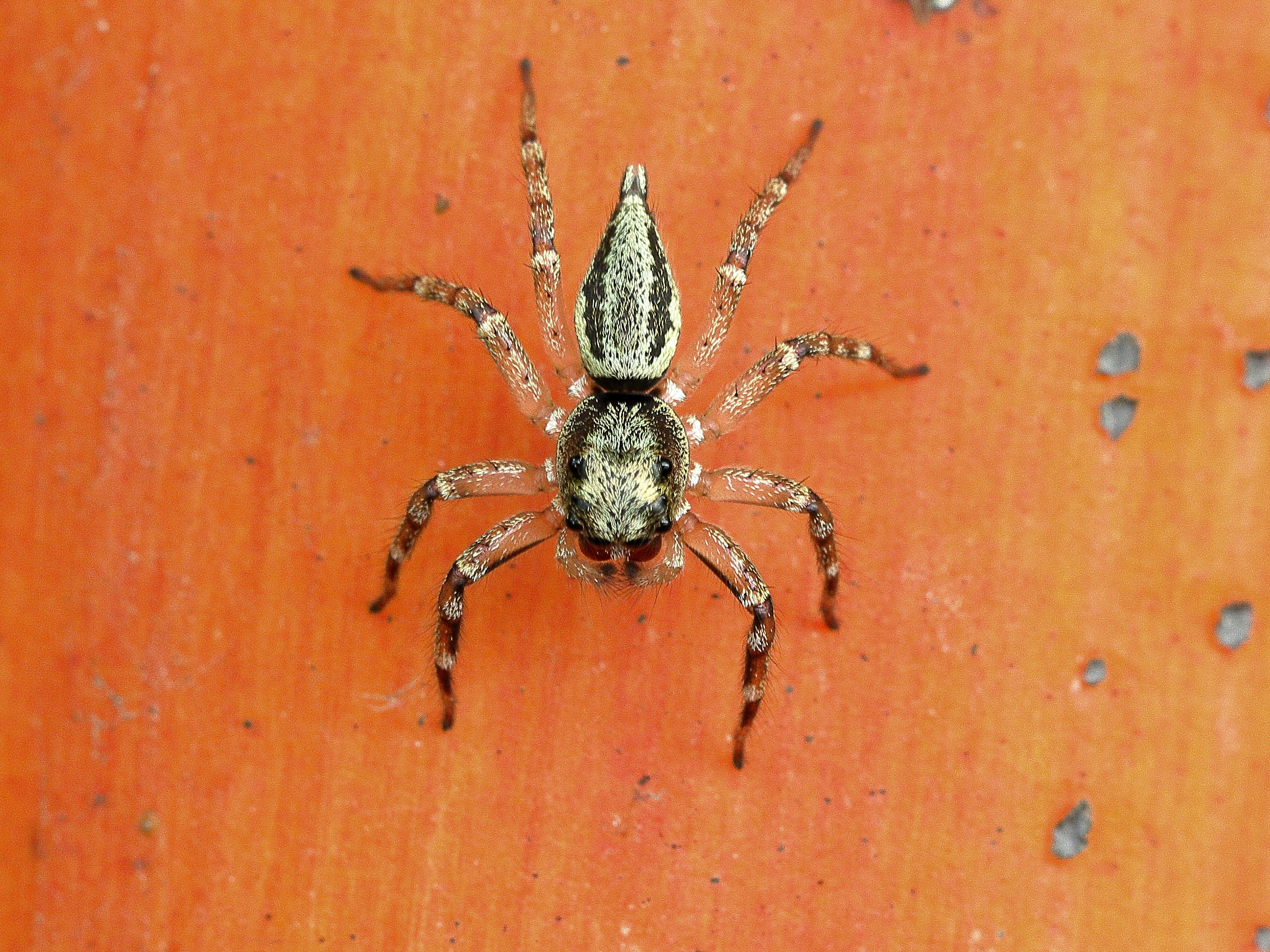
Female dorsal

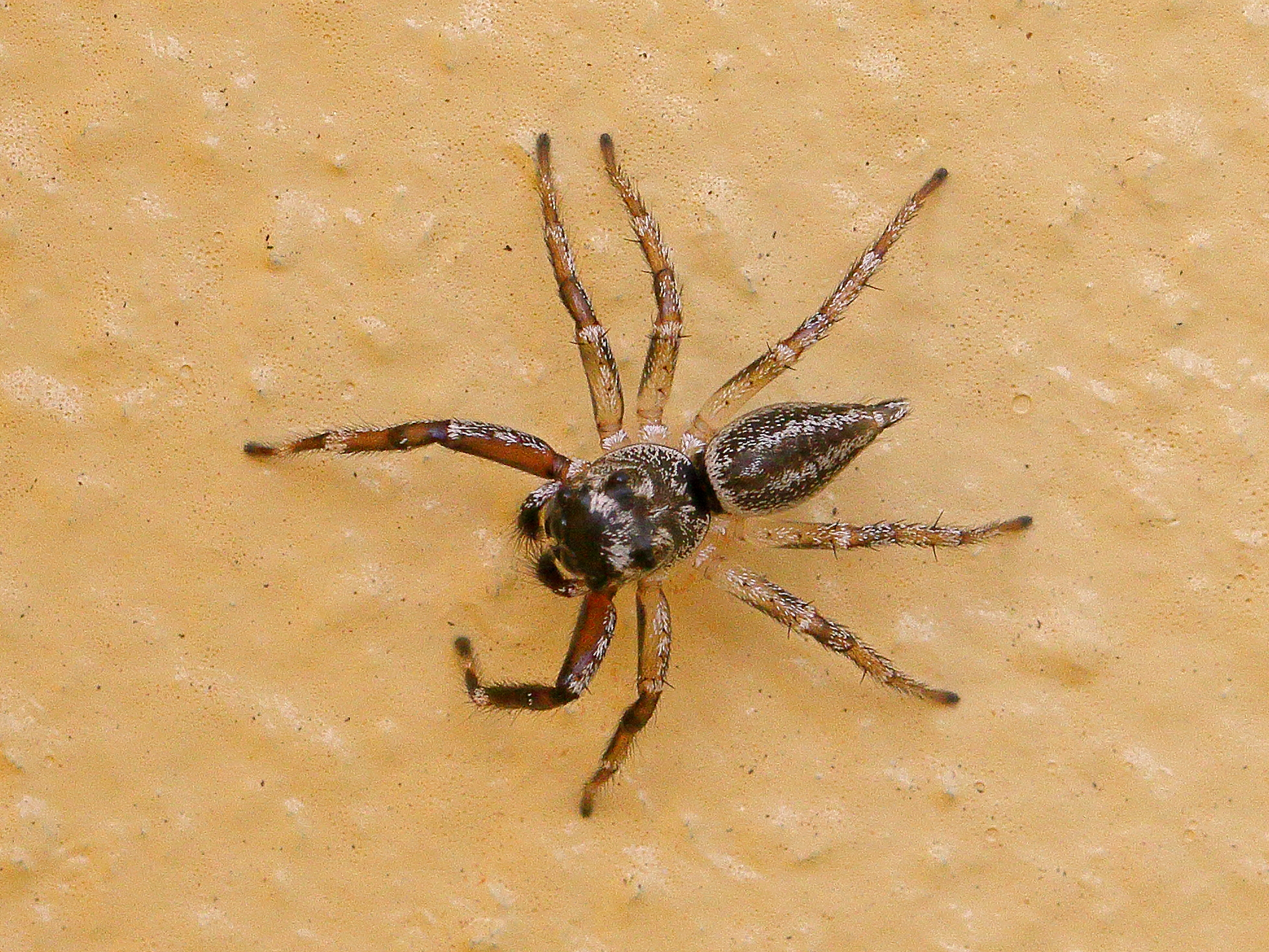
Male dorsal

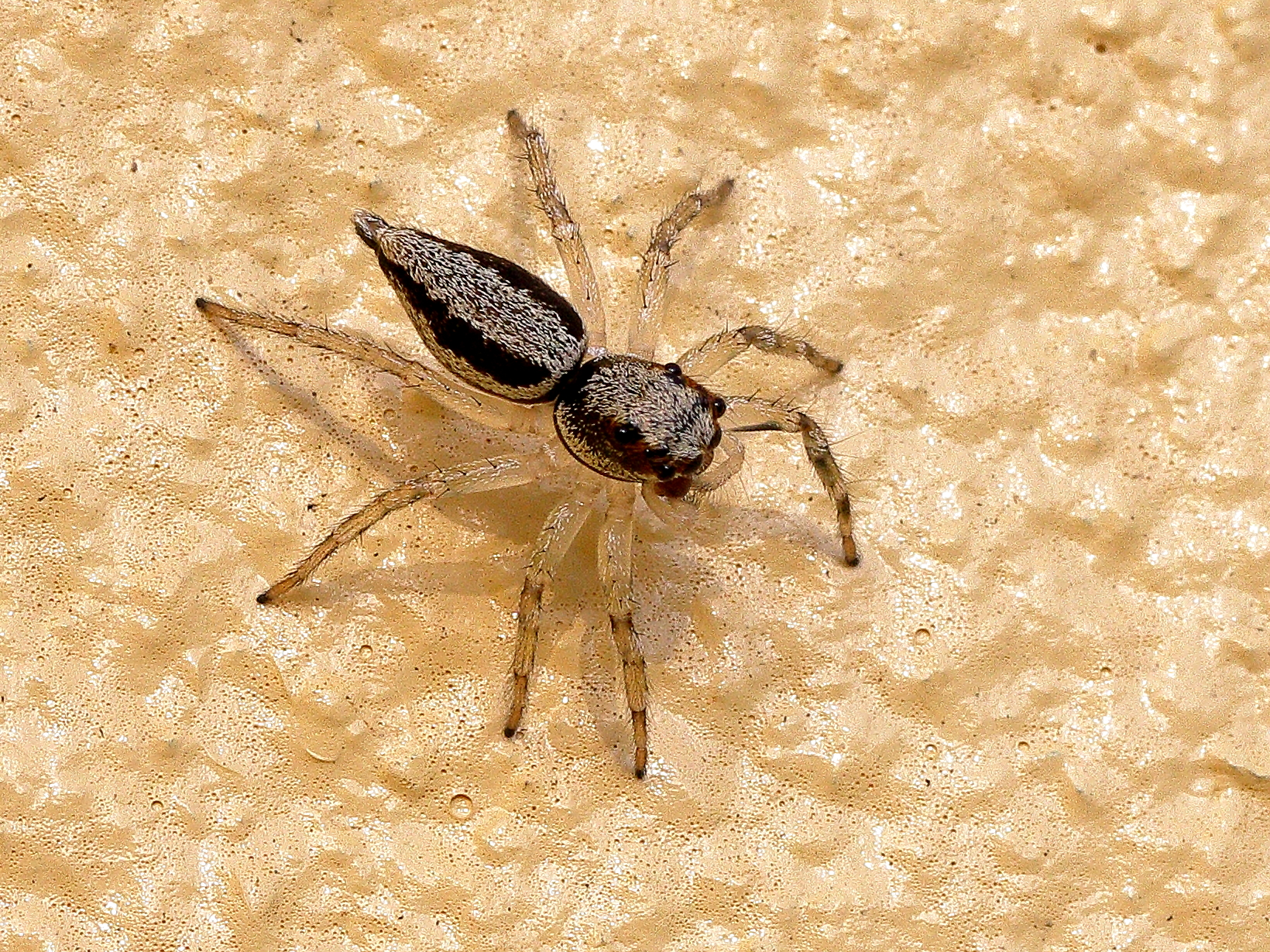
Female

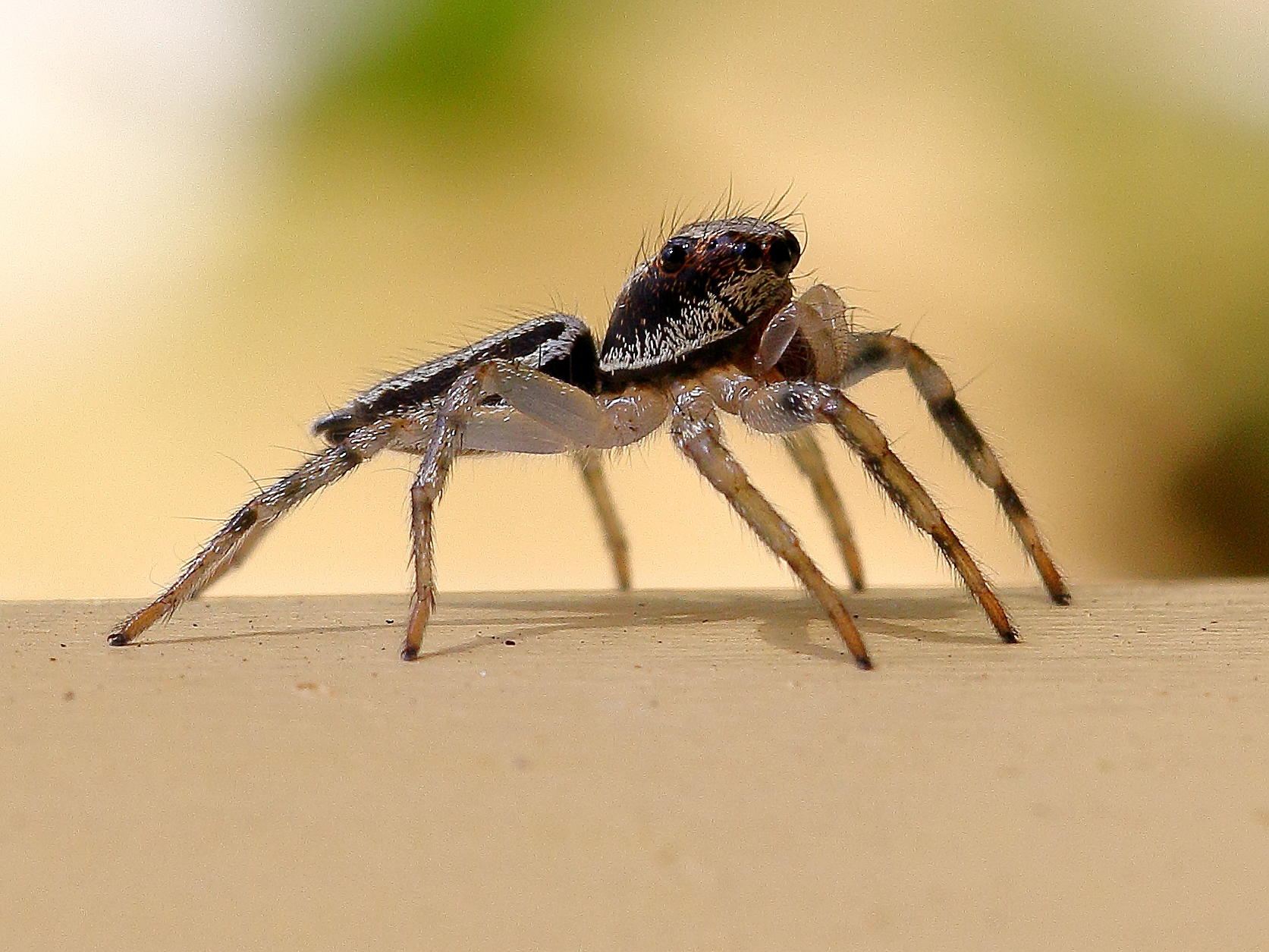
Side view

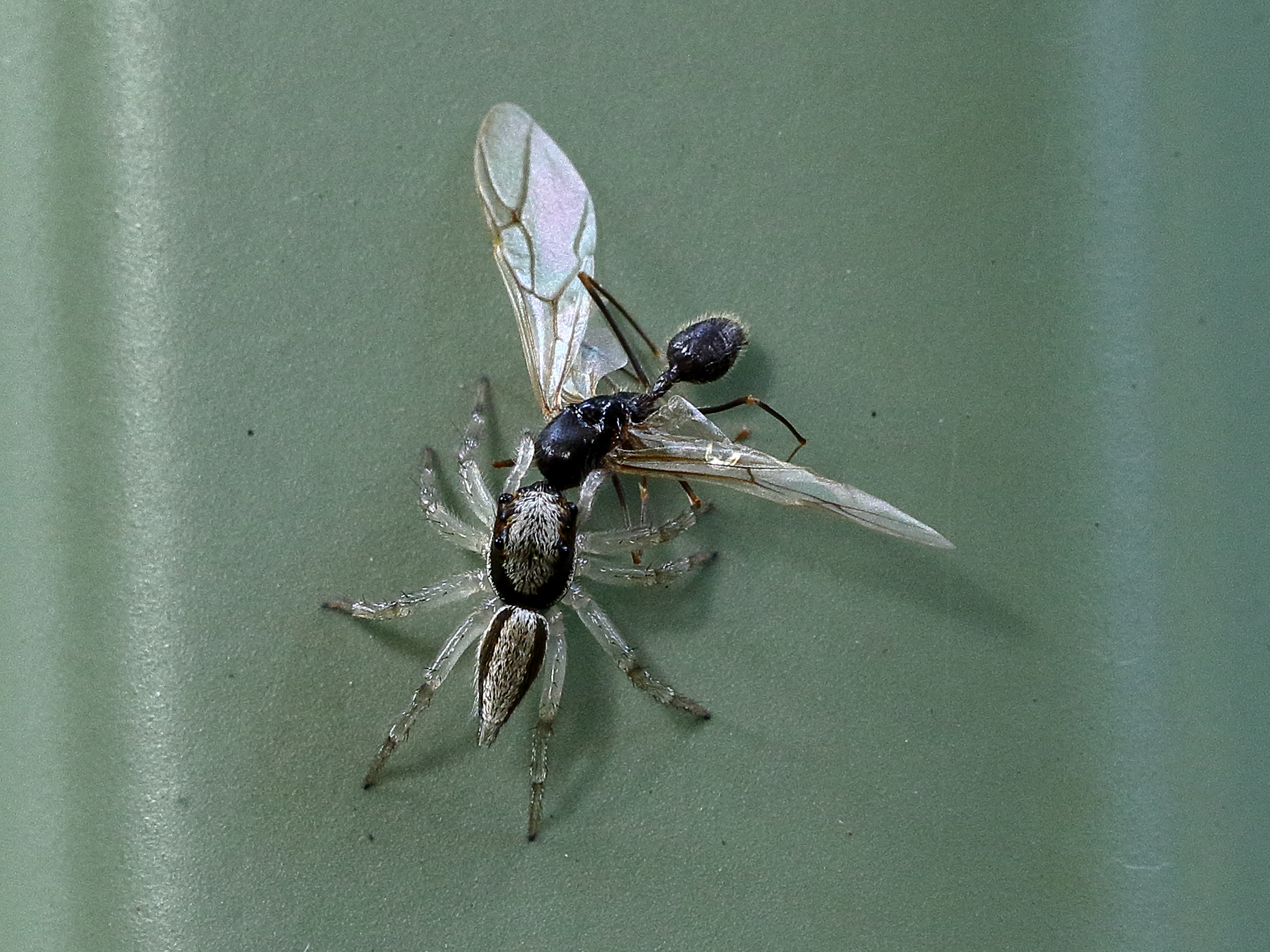
Swifts' ant-hunter with a captured wasp
