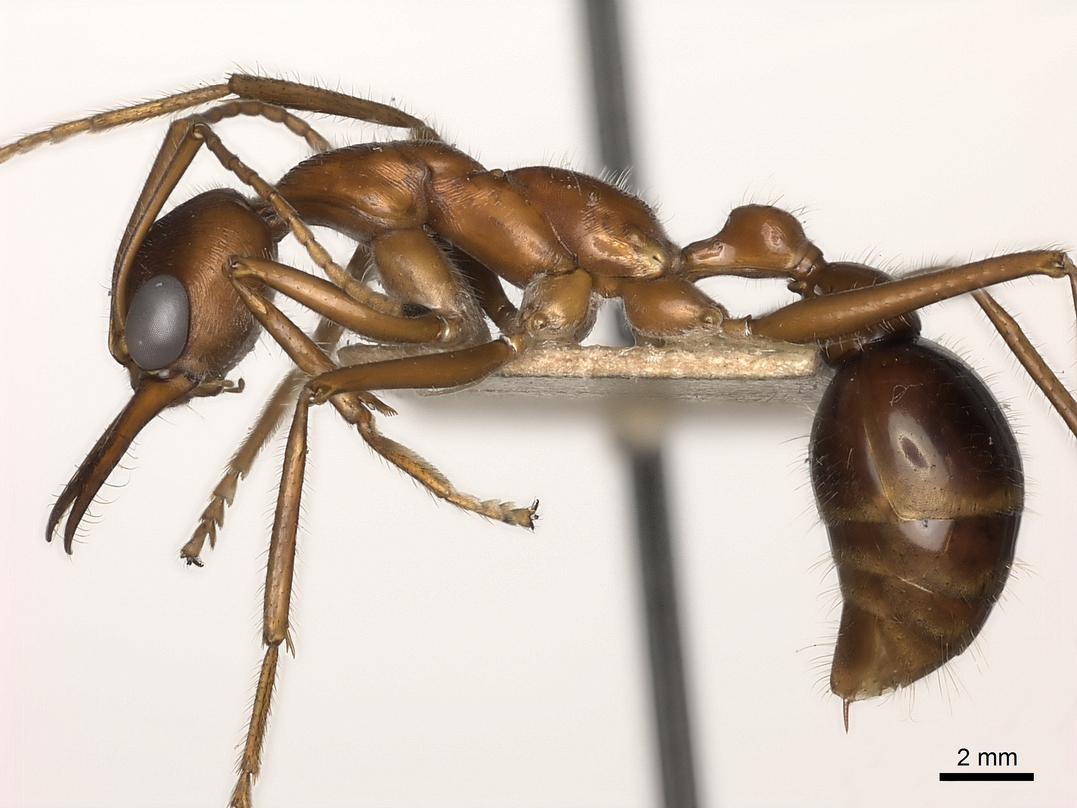

Scientific classification
- Kingdom: Animalia
- Phylum: Arthropoda
- Clade: Pancrustacea
- Class: Insecta
- Order: Hymenoptera
- Family: Formicidae
- Subfamily: Myrmeciinae
- Genus: Myrmecia
- Species: M. regularis

Binomial name
- Myrmecia regularis Crawley, 1925

= Myrmecia regularis =

Species of ant endemic to Australia

Myrmecia regularis is a species of ant endemic to Australia. A member of the genus Myrmecia in the subfamily Myrmeciinae, it was first described by American entomologist Walter Cecil Crawley in 1925. These ants are medium to large in size, measuring 10 to 20 millimetres (0.4 to 0.8 in), and they are bright brownish-red in colour. Queens and workers share similar morphological features, but they can be distinguished by the noticeable size difference. Males also look similar, but collected specimens are too damaged to be examined properly.

Myrmecia regularis is found in the south-western coastal regions, inhabiting eucalypt woodland and open forests. They nest underground and do not build mounds. Workers are active during the day and night, foraging on trees in search for prey and sweet substances such as sap and nectar. The larvae are strictly carnivorous and only eat insects that workers capture. Nuptial flight occurs around February to April, with queens shedding their wings inside the nest and mating near to their parent nest. Queens tend to look for food for their young before they hatch, taking as long as eight months to develop. Certain frog species are known to dwell inside M. regularis colonies.

== Taxonomy ==
Myrmecia regularis was first described by American entomologist Walter Cecil Crawley, who provided the first detailed description of the ant in a 1925 article, "New ants from Australia—II", published in the Annals and Magazine of Natural History. The ant was described from two syntype workers Crawley collected from Albany, Western Australia, now preserved in Crawley's collection in the Oxford University Museum of Natural History. This name was initially short-lived, with Australian entomologist John S. Clark synonymising M. regularis with Myrmecia lucida, now a junior synonym of Myrmecia forficata. Clark's reasons for this were unknown, and William Morton Wheeler revived the species from synonymy, stating that specimens he and W.S. Brooks collected from southwest Australia were distinct from M. lucida, after comparing the two. Wheeler also stated that M. lucida was similar to M. forficata. Despite disagreeing with Wheeler's views, Clark noted in his publication that Wheeler's classification should be retained until the type specimen of M. lucida could be properly examined. In this same publication, Clark synonymised M. lucida with M. regularis. In 1991, entomologists Kazuo Ogata and Robert Taylor reviewed the species groups of Myrmecia. They assigned M. regularis to the M. gulosa species group, based on the morphological characters of worker ants.

== Description ==
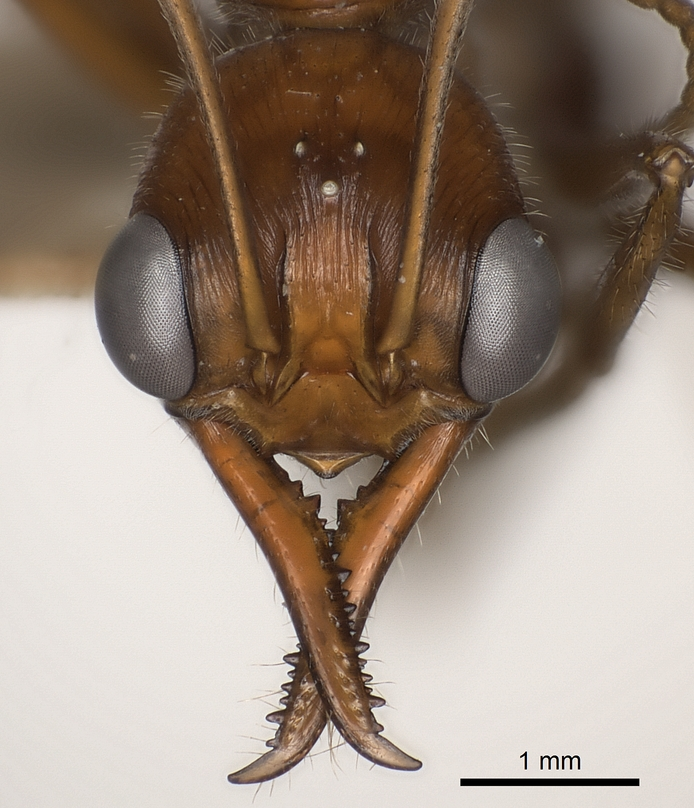
Head detail of M. regularis

Excluding the mandibles, M. regularis workers measure 10 to 14 millimetres (0.4 to 0.6 in), with the mandibles measuring 3.6 millimetres (0.1 in). Including the mandibles, workers measure 14 to 20 millimetres (0.6 to 0.8 in), queens are 18 to 20 millimetres (0.7 to 0.8 in) and males are 15 to 17 millimetres (0.6 to 0.7 in). These ants are bright brownish-red in colour, with brown legs and scapes, and a black gaster. The whole of the head and thorax is a bright mahogany red, while the mandibles are shaded with brown. The hair is yellow, moderately long, erect and found all over the body, but the hairs are shorter on the legs and absent on the antennae. The pubescence (soft short hair) is confined to the clypeus.

The queen shares the same colour variation, body sculpture and pilosity of a worker, but they are usually larger. Queens show reduced thoracic development, and Clark described them as "subapterous", suggesting that wings are present in the females as undifferentiated wing buds. However, queens collected from Manjimup bore well developed wings. The head, epinotum, mesonotum and pronotum are finely striate-rugose. The head is as long as it is broad with a straight occipital border. The mandibles are slightly shorter than the head with a concave border. The pronotum is broader than its total length by one-third and the mesonotum is broader by one-sixth, being almost circular in shape and clearly convex. The epinotum is also broader, but only slightly. The gaster is slightly broader, and the postpetiole is one-fifth broader than long. The scutellum is oval and almost twice as broad as long. Male specimens have been rarely collected, and those that are available are too badly damaged for a proper examination. However, the colour and pilosity of male and worker specimens show little differentiation.

The heads of the workers and queens are as long as broad with convexed sides. The mandibles are long with thirteen known teeth. The first and third segments of the funiculus are equally long. The thorax is longer than broad by two to three-fourths its width, and the mesonotum is longer than it is broad in workers; the mesonotum is broader than it is long in queens. The node (a segment between the mesosoma and gaster) is as long as it is broad, and the postpetiole is one-sixth broader than long. The first segment of the gaster is broader than its length. M. regularis shares a similar appearance to M. forficata, but there are several morphological differences that separate the two. Owing to the rugose sculpture of the head and thorax, M. regularis is noticeably smaller than M. forficata. The mandibles of M. regularis are much narrower, the posterior corners of the head are more round and the petiolar peduncle is longer. The mandibles appear to be deep red, and some areas, such as the gastric segments, are golden brown.

== Distribution and habitat ==
Myrmecia regularis is found in the south-western coastal regions of Australia. Nests have been recorded in the towns of Albany, Denmark, Nornalup, Manjimup, Pemberton and around the Margaret River in south Western Australia, Kangaroo Island in South Australia and Portland in Victoria. The ant prefers to inhabit a variety of rural environments, including woodland, open forests, dry marri forests, tree heath and granite mountains. In particular, it is a dominant species in Eucalyptus woodland, especially when E. diversicolor, E. gomphocephala and E. marginata trees are present. M. regularis colonies do not form mounds, but rather nest in damp, black soil or under large stones and logs with 100 to 200 workers present. These colonies are usually found at altitudes of between 80 and 350 m (260 and 1,150 ft) above sea level. Excavated incipient nests (young colonies beginning to develop) show small chambers 2.5 to 4 cm (0.98 to 1.57 in) wide, where logs and stones form the roof of the cell. The ground is flat with walls continuous on all sides; the outer walls tend to be thin, as they are situated near the edges of a log or stone. Most nests have a gallery which descends further into the ground, usually around 6 cm (2.4 in) and forms a small and more irregular chamber.

== Behaviour and ecology ==
Myrmecia regularis is a highly aggressive ant that will pursue any intruder to a distance of 1.8–2.7 metres (2–3 yards) if their nests are disturbed. Their stings are very painful and particularly powerful. In some cases, human victims of M. regularis bites have displayed an allergy to the venom. In a 2011 study which investigated the causes of ant sting anaphylaxis in Australia, 265 of the 376 human participants reacted to the sting of several Myrmecia species. Of these, nine serum samples taken from patients were IgE positive to the venom of M. regularis. These ants are both diurnal and nocturnal, foraging on the trunks of Eucalyptus trees to feed on sap and nectar, or capturing small insects (such as caterpillars and ants in the genus Camponotus or subgenus Orthocrema). The larvae are carnivorous and exclusively feed on insects, either consuming small portions of the insect or all of it. Unlike most Myrmecia species, trophallaxis takes place among adults or between adults and larvae. All stages of the frog Metacrinia nichollsi are known to dwell inside M. regularis colonies, where they use several galleries constructed by the ants. The parasitic ant M. inquilina may attempt to enter M. regularis nests to establish colonies, but M. inquilina queens may be seized and killed as soon as the two species come into contact.

Observations show that nuptial flight does not occur before February. This is based on larvae spinning into cocoons by November, and by January, these cocoons could not produce adult workers or reproductive males and females. Queens are most likely fertilised by males sometime between February and April; however, scientists have seen alates engage in nuptial flight during March. Before emerging from their parent nest, queens will shed their wings inside the nest and mate with low-flying males nearby. After nuptial flight, a queen will isolate herself and form a small chamber underground, where she remains for seven to eight months. However, it is improbable that a queen can survive on her own storage of fat and wing-musculature for that long. During this time, the queen may emerge from her nest occasionally, but she will only lay eggs from October to November when there is a rich supply of food. While this may be the case, some queens will lay eggs after a month of isolation during winter. M. regularis is a semi-clasutral ant, meaning that a queen will go out and forage in order to feed her young. Queens will emerge from their nests from time to time, during which they will capture insects for their young or feed on sweet substances. If food sources are deprived, a queen will only rely on her fat to feed the larvae until she perishes or finds food, but the larvae will not be cannibalised, and remain alive until a week after the queen's death. An individual ant may take eight months to develop from an egg to an adult.
