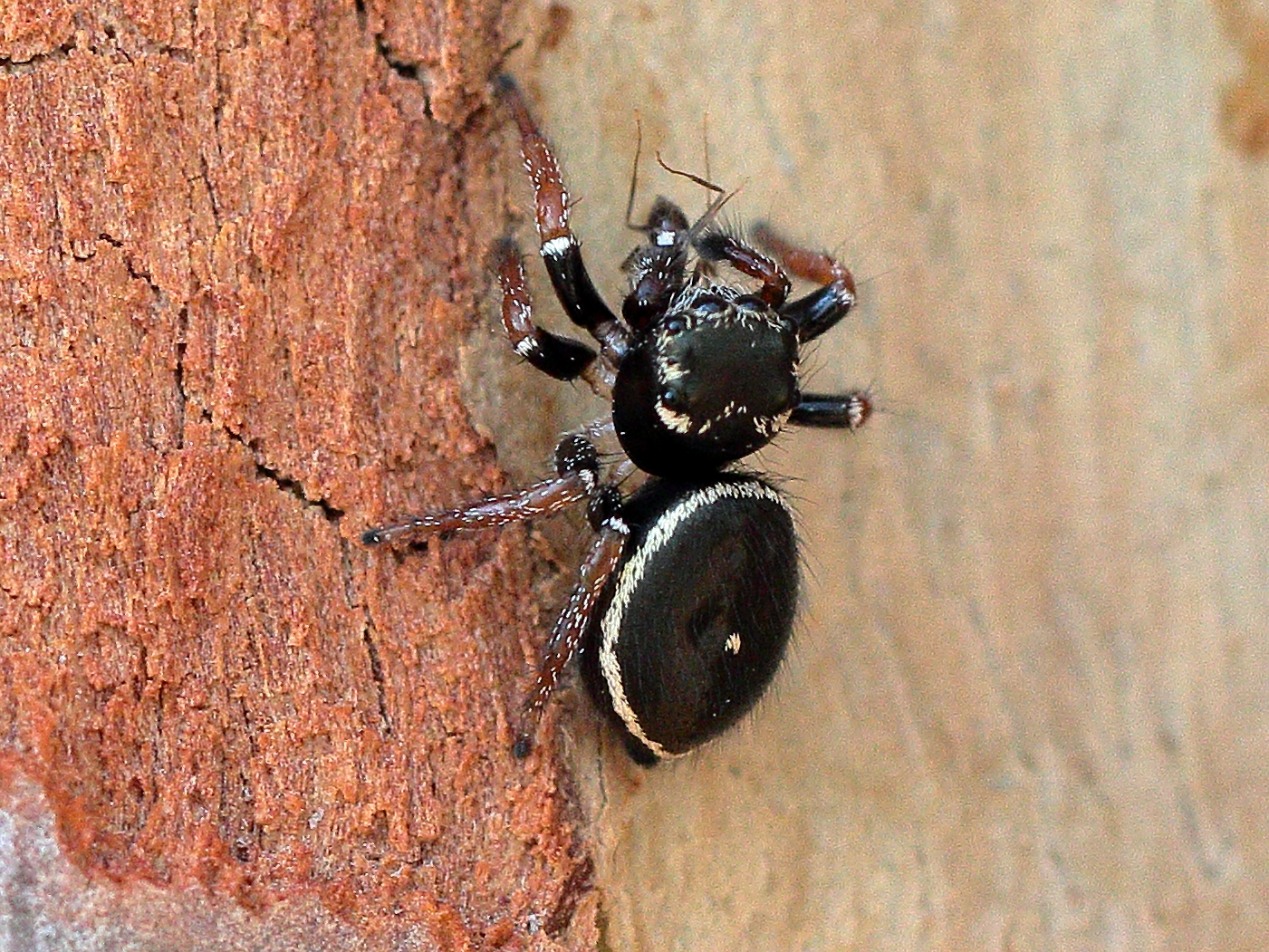
- At Atherton Tableland, Queensland

Scientific classification
- Kingdom: Animalia
- Phylum: Arthropoda
- Subphylum: Chelicerata
- Class: Arachnida
- Order: Araneae
- Infraorder: Araneomorphae
- Family: Salticidae
- Genus: Zenodorus
- Species: Z. orbiculatus

Binomial name
- Zenodorus orbiculatus (Keyserling, 1881)

Synonyms
- Hasarius orbiculatus Keyserling, 1881; Omoedus orbiculatus (Keyserling, 1881); Pystira orbiculata (Keyserling, 1881); Zenodorus orbiculatus (Keyserling, 1881)

= Zenodorus orbiculatus =

Australian ant species

Zenodorus orbiculatus, the round ant eater, is a species of ant-hunting jumping spider found in Australia. The species was first formally named by Eugen von Keyserling in 1881 as Hasarius orbiculatus.

== Description ==
Zenodorus orbiculatus are dark brown to black, with pale markings on the carapace behind the eyes, a circular pattern on the abdomen with a dot in the centre, and a pale band on the femur of each leg. Females and males grow to 8 mm (0.31 in) overall body length. The species is widespread and abundant in Queensland, scattered throughout the remainder of Australia.

The food preference is ants, but they also consume other spiders and insects.

== Gallery ==
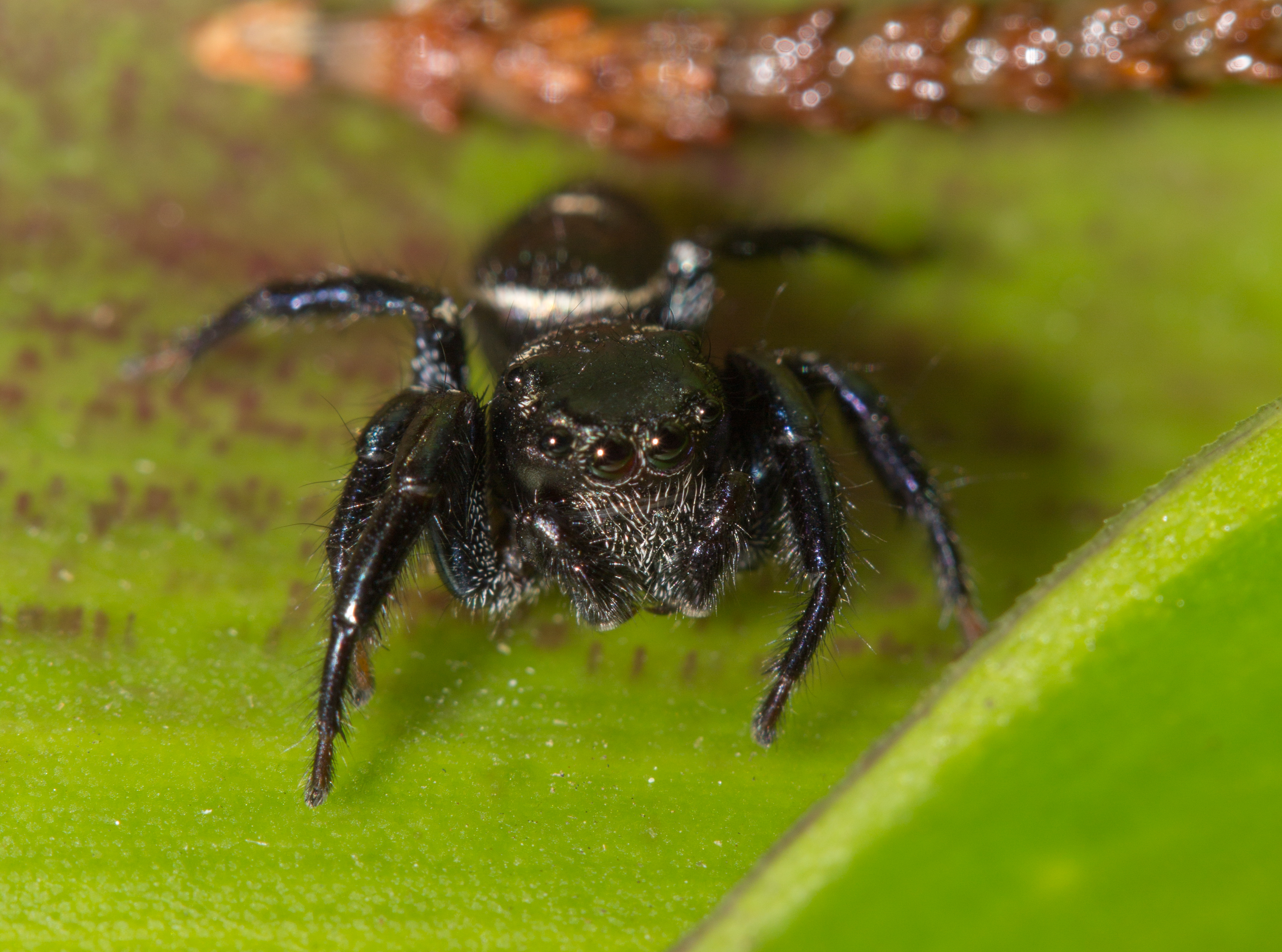
In Brisbane

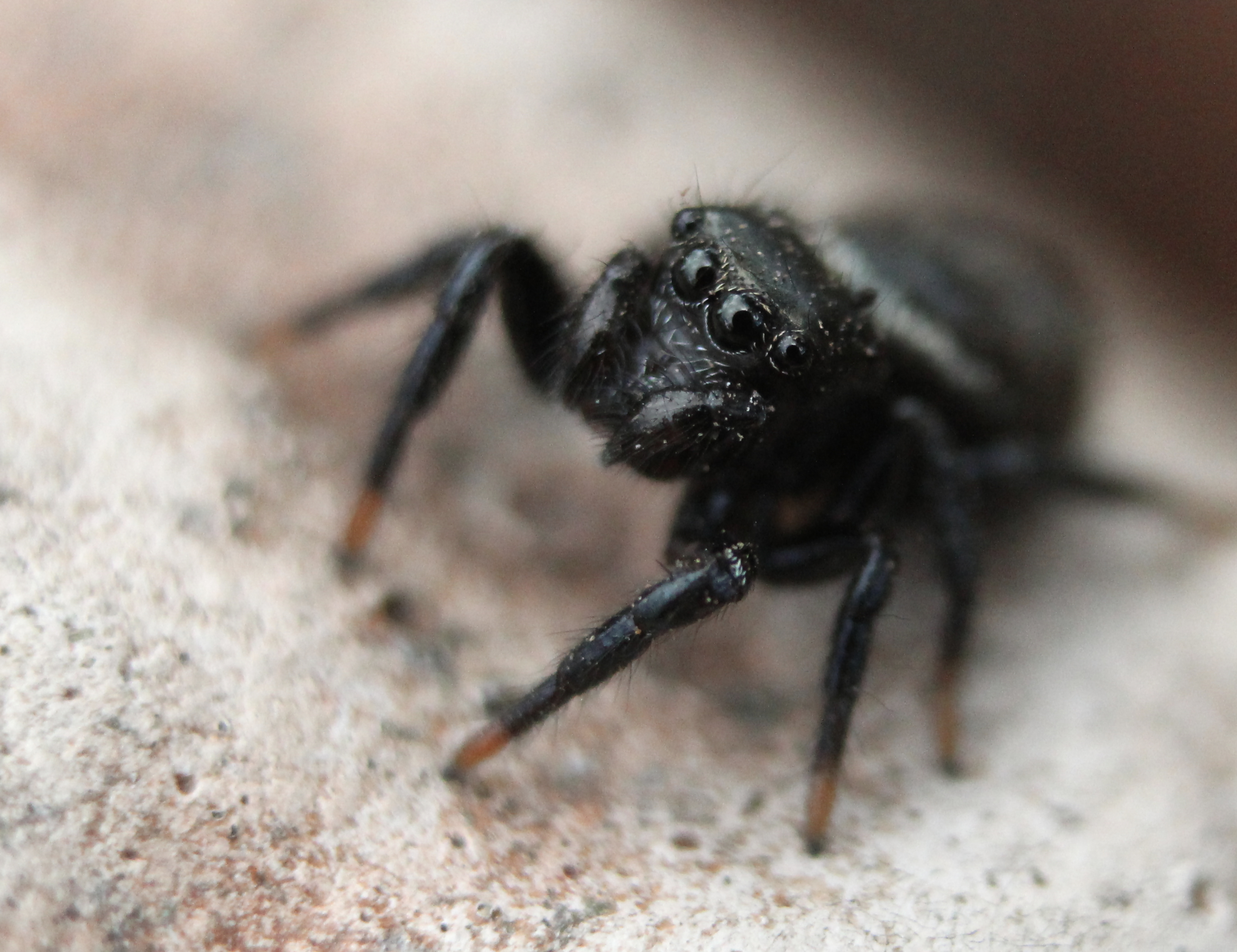
In Brisbane
