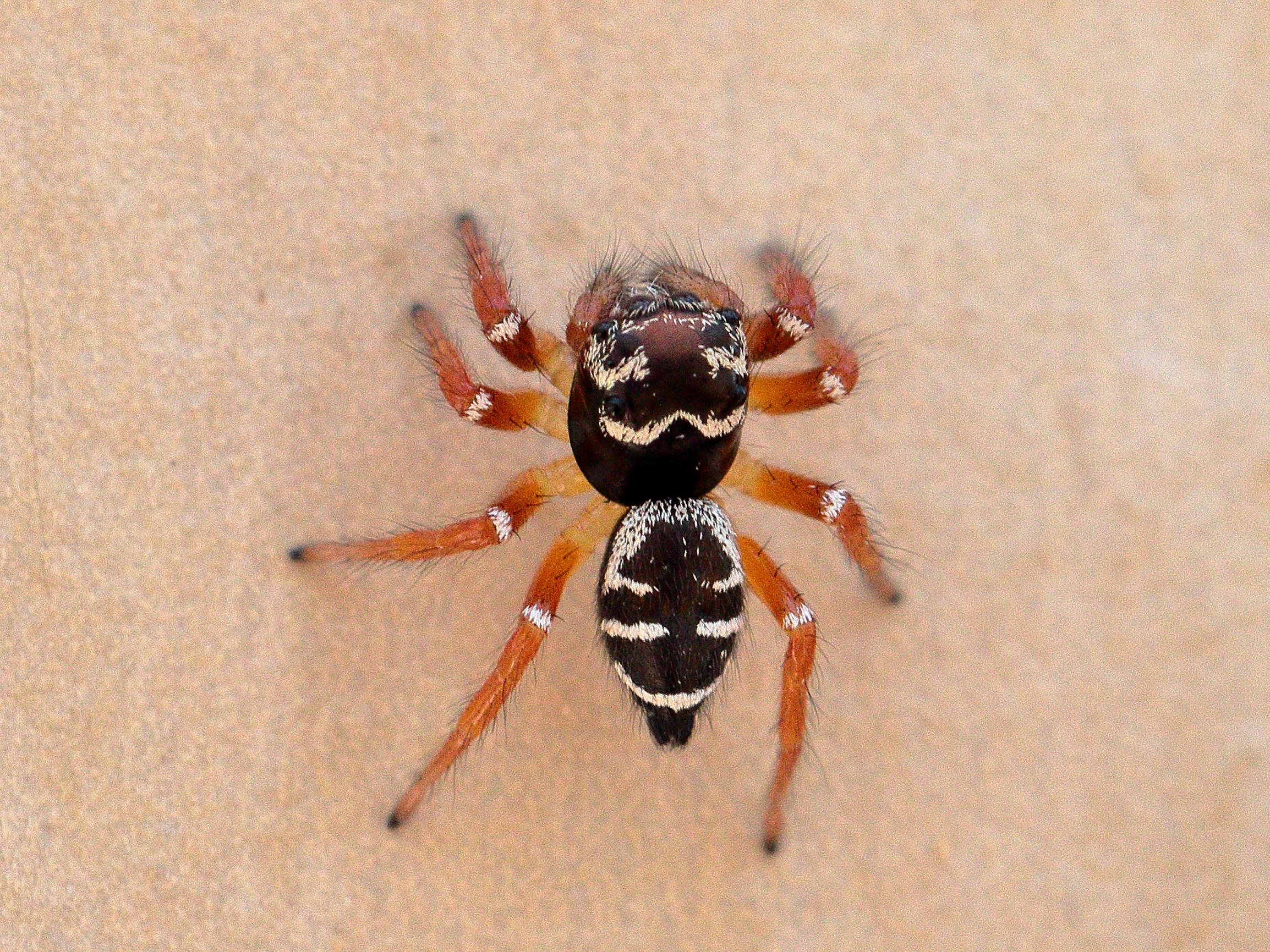
- Atherton Tableland, Queensland

Scientific classification
- Kingdom: Animalia
- Phylum: Arthropoda
- Subphylum: Chelicerata
- Class: Arachnida
- Order: Araneae
- Infraorder: Araneomorphae
- Family: Salticidae
- Genus: Zenodorus
- Species: Z. metallescens

Binomial name
- Zenodorus metallescens (L. Koch, 1879)

Synonyms
- Philaeus metallescens (L.Koch, 1879); Mollika metallescens (Peckham & Peckham, 1901)

= Zenodorus metallescens =

Cast-iron jumping spider

Species of spider

Zenodorus metallescens is a species of ant-hunting jumping spider found in Papua New Guinea and Australia. The common name is cast-iron jumping spider as the white patterns on the abdomen resemble cast-iron designs in fences and gates.

== Description ==
Zenodorus metallescens are black, with white markings on the carapace and abdomen. The legs are light brown with a white band on the femur of each leg. Females and males grow to 11 mm (0.43 in) overall body length. The species is common in northern Queensland and recognisable with contrasting colours.

== Gallery ==
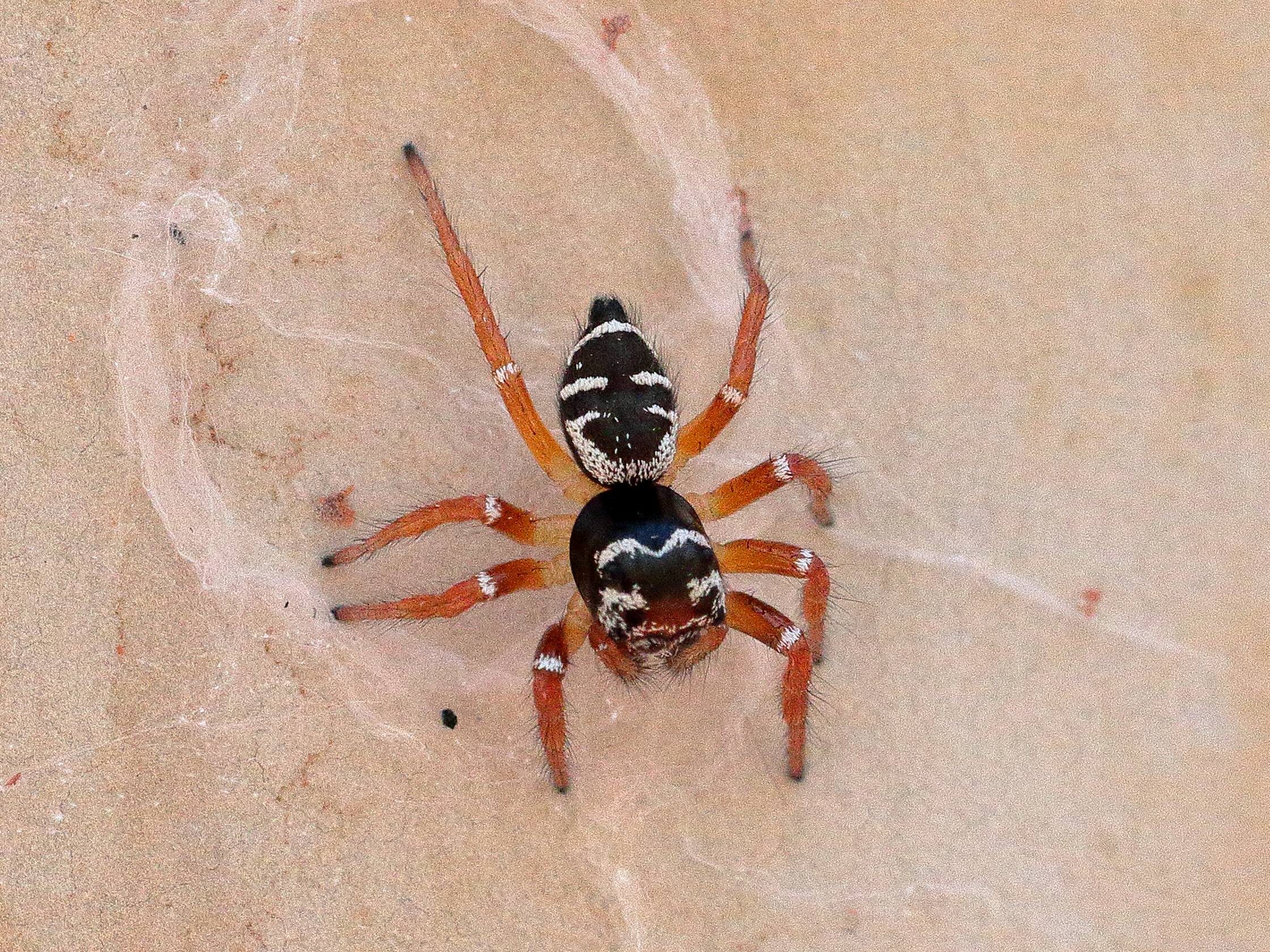
Zenodorus metallescens Dinden National Park, Queensland
