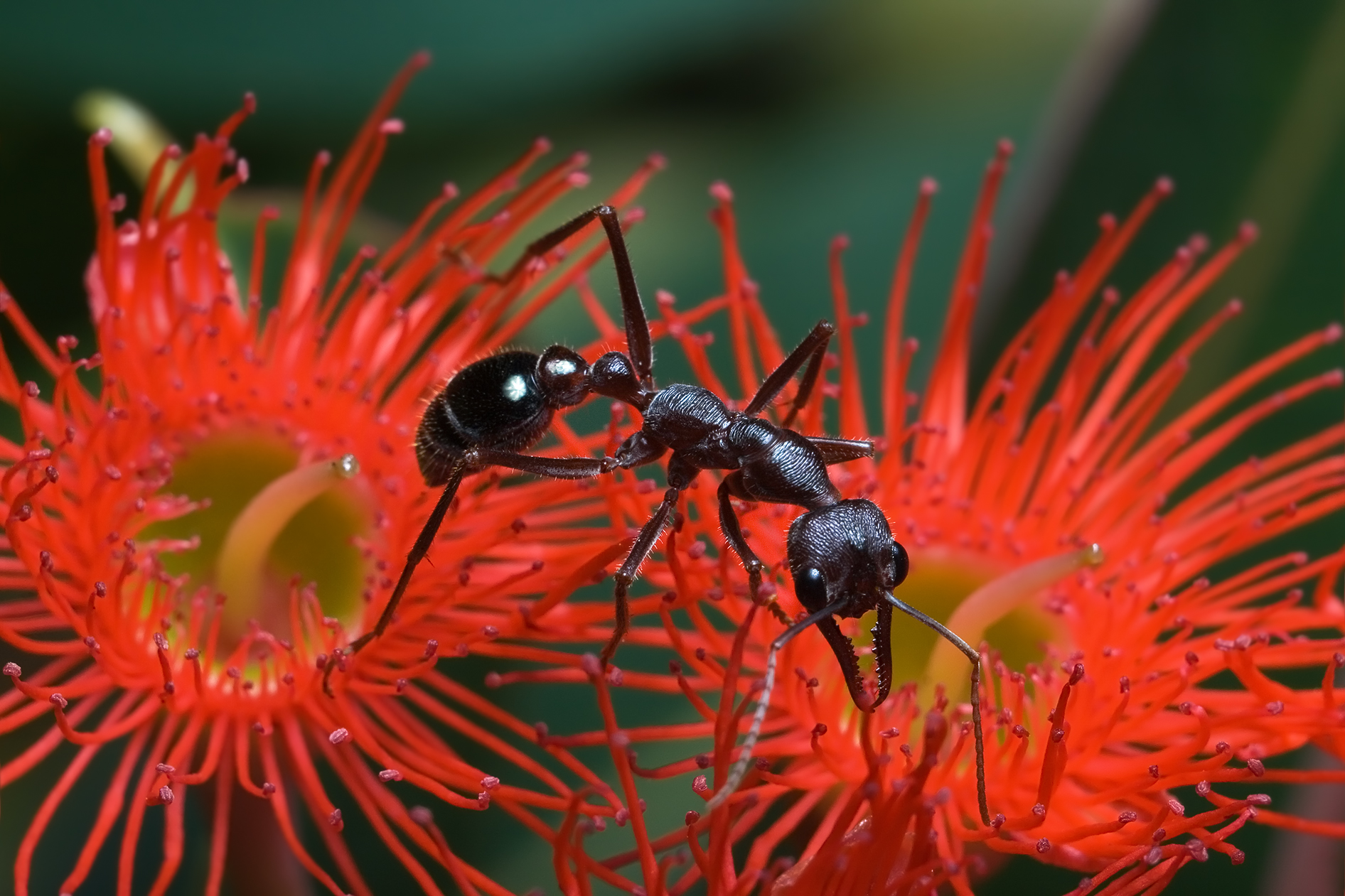

Scientific classification
- Kingdom: Animalia
- Phylum: Arthropoda
- Clade: Pancrustacea
- Class: Insecta
- Order: Hymenoptera
- Family: Formicidae
- Subfamily: Myrmeciinae
- Genus: Myrmecia
- Species: M. forficata

Binomial name
- Myrmecia forficata (Fabricius, 1787)

= Myrmecia forficata =

Species of ant

Myrmecia forficata, commonly known as the inchman ant, is a species of bull ant that is native to Australia. The ants are recorded in the south eastern part of the country, but are most common in the Australian Alps at elevations above 300m but can be found down to sea level around Melbourne and in Tasmania.

The inchman is the most venomous of the bulldog ants, ranging from about 15 to 25 mm (0.6 to 1.0 in) long, but less aggressive than the Jack jumper ant. These ants are purplish-brown, with a black abdomen. Their large size gave them their name, although most are slightly smaller than the traditional inch (25.4 mm). Their nests may be inconspicuously hidden under a rock or in a small hole.

As with many species of bulldog ants, the inchman are usually solitary when they forage, though they live in colonies like most ants. Inchman are carnivores and scavengers. They sting their victims with venom analogous to stings of wasps, bees, and fire ants. Their venom is some of the most powerful in the insect world. The reputation for being the most venomous ant is possibly due to the tendency of the toxin to induce anaphylaxis which can be fatal in some people.

The symptoms of the stings of the ants are similar to stings of the fire ants. The reaction is local; swelling, reddening and fever, followed by formation of a blister. The heart rate increases, and blood pressure falls rapidly. In about 3% of cases, the sting causes anaphylaxis. Treatment is very similar to wasp and bee stings.
