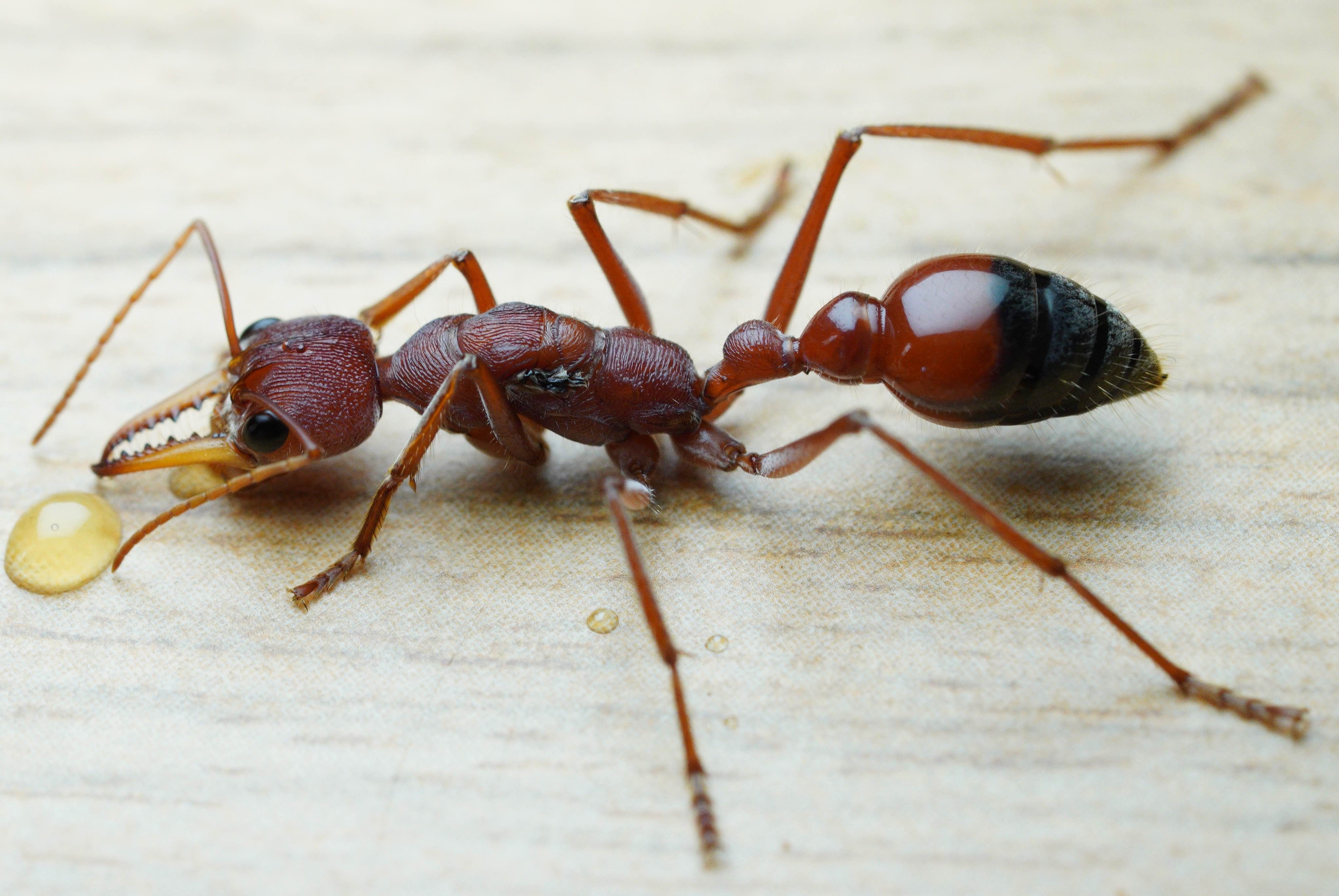
- A Myrmecia gulosa queen, pictured in Sydney, Australia.

Scientific classification
- Kingdom: Animalia
- Phylum: Arthropoda
- Clade: Pancrustacea
- Class: Insecta
- Order: Hymenoptera
- Family: Formicidae
- Subfamily: Myrmeciinae
- Genus: Myrmecia
- Species: M. gulosa

Binomial name
- Myrmecia gulosa (Fabricius, 1775)
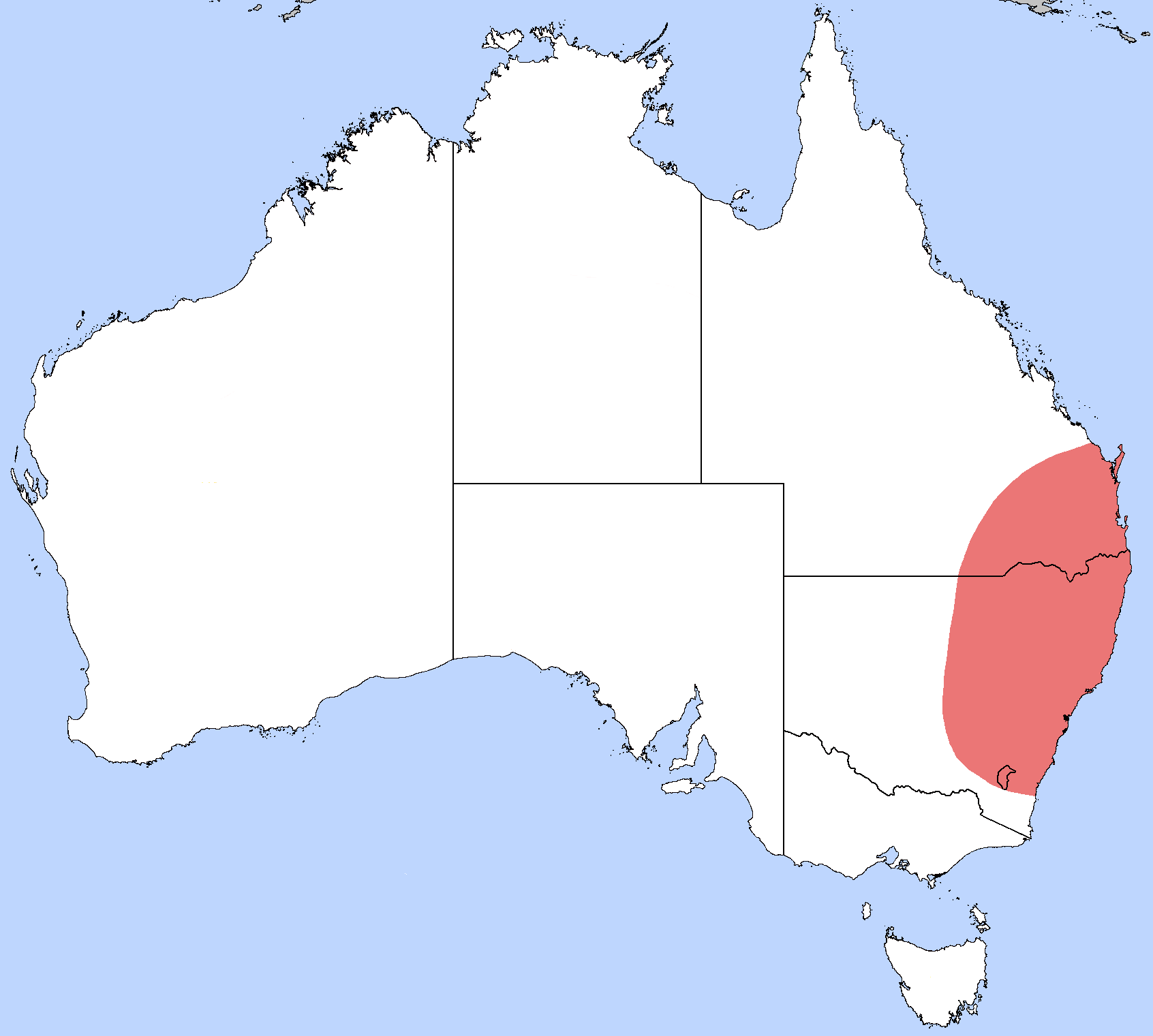

= Myrmecia gulosa =

Species of ant

Myrmecia gulosa, the red bull ant, also known as the giant bull ant or Bulldog Ant, is a species of bulldog ant from the genus Myrmecia. It is abundant throughout Eastern Australia.

== Taxonomy ==
The first Myrmecia gulosa specimen was collected in 1770 by Joseph Banks, making it one of the first Australian insects to be collected and described by a European.

== Description ==
Being one of the larger ant species, adult individuals have been observed to be as long as 15 mm to 30 mm in body length. The head and thorax are typically coloured red-brown; the rear half of the abdomen is black and the mandibles brown-yellow. Adults characteristically possess the long, powerful serrated mandibles and a venom-laced sting that is capable of causing severe pain for a couple of days. Unlike most other ant species, red bull ants lack the ability of chemical senses; however, this is compensated by their extremely keen vision, with which they can spot and respond to intruders up to two metres away.

== Distribution and habitat ==
Myrmecia gulosa ants are abundant in eastern Australia. They can be found in the coastal regions of Queensland and eastern New South Wales. Populations can be found in the Australian Capital Territory and in the Murray-Darling Basin. Colonies of M. gulosa ants have been recorded from Black Mountain, Brisbane, Fletcher, Stanthorpe and St. George in Queensland, and in New South Wales they have been recorded in Lismore, Armidale, Narrabri, Clarence River, Taree and in Sydney (in the suburbs of Como, Oatley and Liverpool).

Their distribution in Victoria, Tasmania, South Australia, Northern Territory and Western Australia has been verified. A specimen was documented in Victoria in 2024. Based on specimens collected, they are found living in elevations ranging from 121 to 2,000 m (400 to 6,600 ft). M. gulosa ants generally construct small mounds, and they prefer open areas where they are frequently seen foraging. Foraging workers are frequently observed being around burnt areas.

== Behaviour ==
Regarded as a relatively "primitive" ant species, red bull ants are known to be solitary predators that are occasionally uncooperative with one another, whose social behaviour is poorly developed in comparison to more "advanced" species. They are notoriously aggressive hunters able to subdue formidable prey such as bees and other ants. Unable to eat solid food, adult ants feed on juices from the prey insects; the meat of the prey is fed to the colony's larvae. Their diet is supplemented by the workers' own trophic (infertile) eggs, which are commonly fed to the queen and larvae.

Nests are constructed with tunnel systems and may become quite extensive.

== External images ==
- Media related to Myrmecia gulosa at Wikimedia Commons
- Myrmecia gulosa - Antweb
