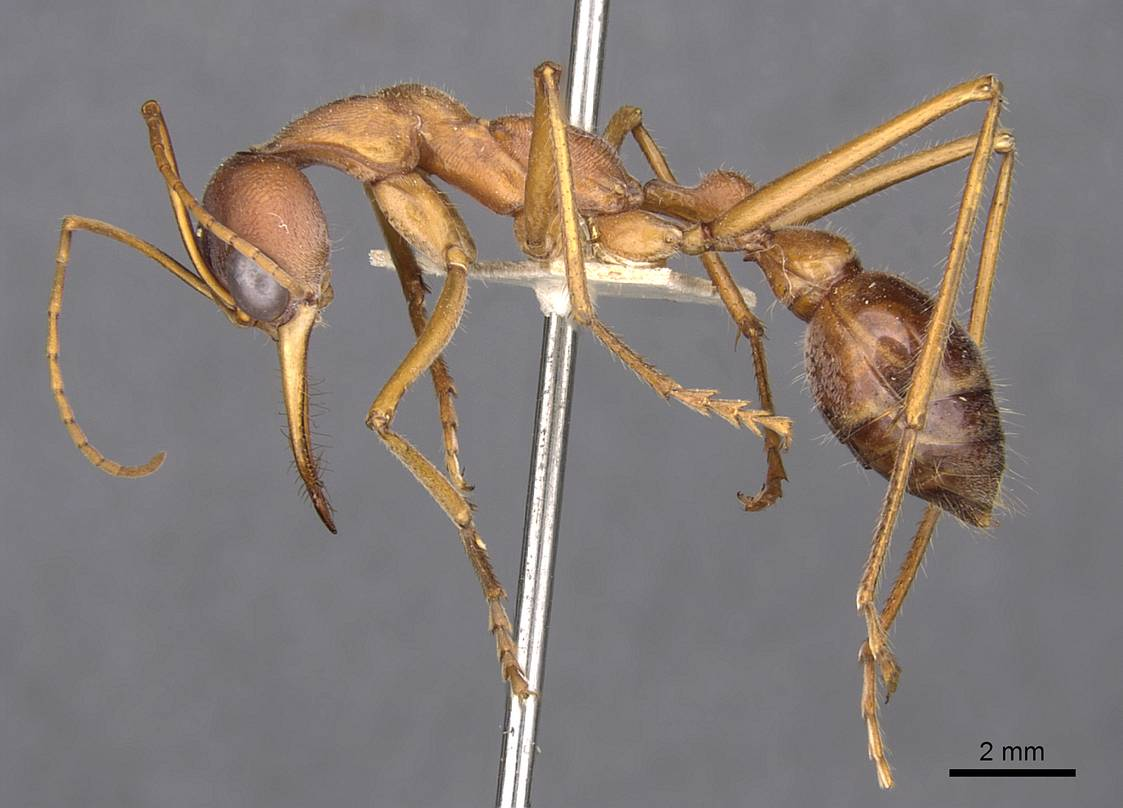
- Myrmecia vindex worker

Scientific classification
- Kingdom: Animalia
- Phylum: Arthropoda
- Clade: Pancrustacea
- Class: Insecta
- Order: Hymenoptera
- Family: Formicidae
- Subfamily: Myrmeciinae
- Genus: Myrmecia
- Species: M. vindex

Binomial name
- Myrmecia vindex F. Smith, 1858

= Myrmecia vindex =

Species of ant endemic to Australia

Myrmecia vindex is a species of Myrmecia which is endemic to Australia. As a subgroup of the Myrmecia gulosa species group, these ants are also commonly known as the Bull Ant. The Myrmecia vindex was collected and described by Frederick Smith in 1858.

== Appearance ==
Myrmecia vindex's are around 21 millimetres long on average, and they have normally have a red head, and a black abdomen. Their mandibles are long, strongly toothed, and appears in a yellow palish colour.

== Habitat ==
These ants are commonly found in Western Australia, but also range further into South Australia. They prefer to live in open, dry woodland habitat.

== Behavior ==
The nocturnal M. vindex relies exclusively on vision for navigation with eyes having ultraviolet-, blue- and a green-sensitive photoreceptor cells. Compared to other species within the genus Myrmecia, M. vindex are socially less evolved and typically have small populations. During the height of their breeding season, Myrmecia vindex commonly pile discarded cocoons and shed exoskeletons on the crater of their nest, near the entrance.
