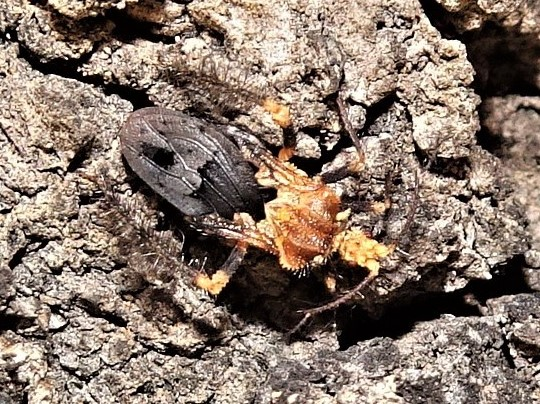

Scientific classification
- Domain: Eukaryota
- Kingdom: Animalia
- Phylum: Arthropoda
- Class: Insecta
- Order: Hemiptera
- Suborder: Heteroptera
- Family: Reduviidae
- Genus: Ptilocnemus
- Species: P. femoralis

Binomial name
- Ptilocnemus femoralis Horváth, 1902

= Ptilocnemus femoralis =

Species of true bug

Ptilocnemus femoralis is a species of feather-legged bugs in the subfamily Holoptilinae. This species is found in Australia and has a specialized gland called a trichome that produces a chemical to attract and paralyze ants.
