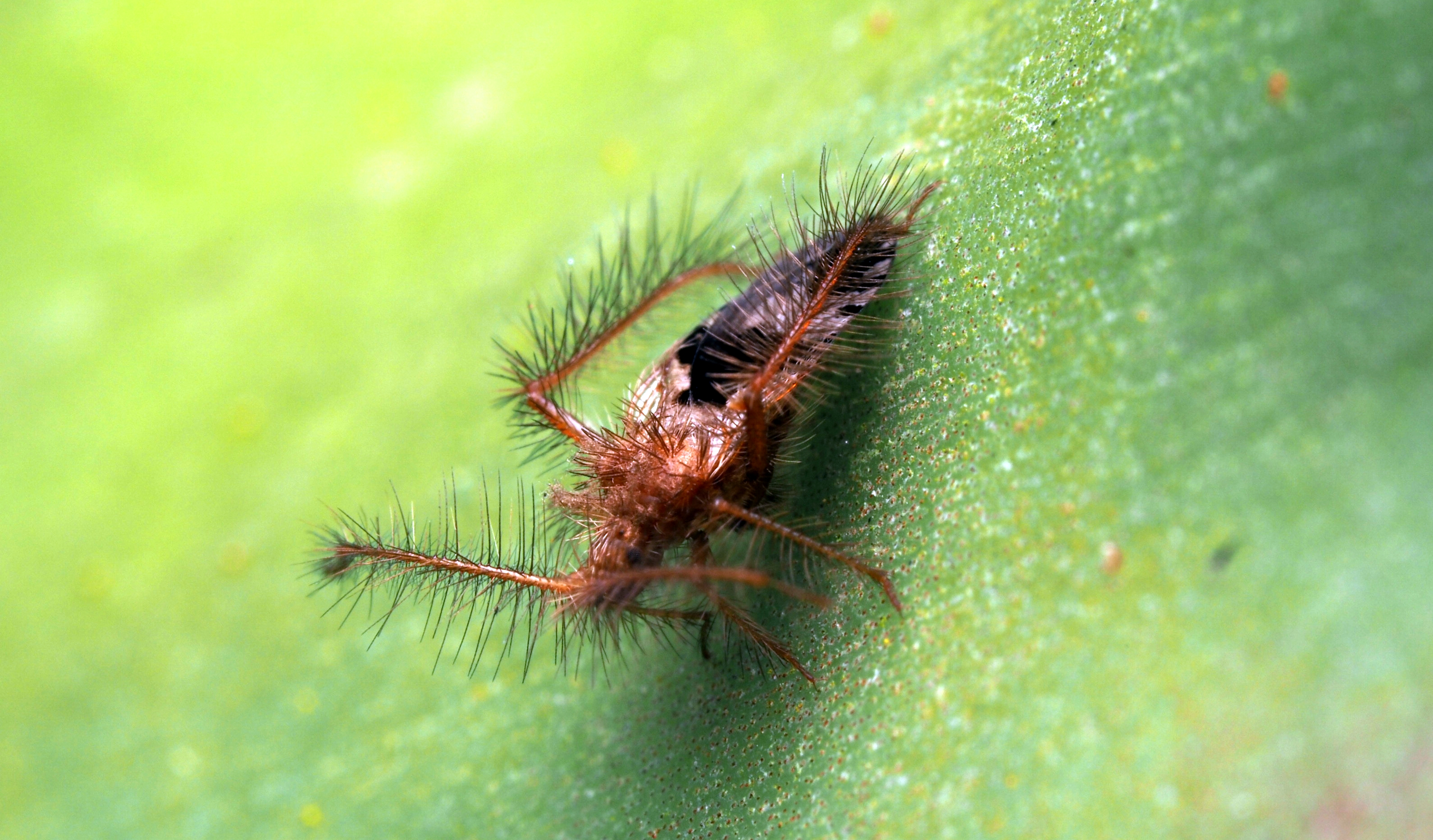
- Holoptilus fasciatus from India

Scientific classification
- Kingdom: Animalia
- Phylum: Arthropoda
- Clade: Pancrustacea
- Class: Insecta
- Order: Hemiptera
- Suborder: Heteroptera
- Family: Reduviidae
- Subfamily: Holoptilinae
- Genus: Holoptilus; Lepeletier & Audinet-Serville, 1825

Type species
- Holoptilus ursus Lepeletier & Serville, 1825

= Holoptilus =

Genus of insects

Holoptilus is a genus of feather-legged assassin bug. Like others in the subfamily, they are characterised by their uniquely long hairs/setae. Most adults of this genus have a trichome on the underside of the abdomen, which is thought to produce chemicals to attract ants on which they prey. There are about 25 described species from the Old World tropics (Afrotropical, Indomalayan and Palearctic Realms).

Species in the genus include:

- Holoptilus agnellus Westwood, 1874
- Holoptilus aries Miller, 1940
- Holoptilus astutus Miller, 1950
- Holoptilus braunsi Miller, 1950
- Holoptilus capensis Miller, 1950
- Holoptilus cuneatus Miller, 1950
- Holoptilus dimidiatus Westwood, 1874
- Holoptilus fasciatus Reuter, 1881
- Holoptilus flavus Montandon, 1907
- Holoptilus fur Miller, 1940
- Holoptilus gillonae Villiers, 1965
- Holoptilus katanganus Villiers, 1954
- Holoptilus kinabaluensis Miller, 1940
- Holoptilus lacustris Miller, 1950
- Holoptilus leprosus Miller, 1940
- Holoptilus lupus Wallengren, 1875
- Holoptilus melanospilus (Walker, 1873)
- Holoptilus nebulosus Stål, 1865
- Holoptilus oraniensis Puton, 1885
- Holoptilus silvanus Hsiao, 1974
- Holoptilus transvaalensis Montandon, 1908
- Holoptilus ursus Lepeletier and Serville, 1825
- Holoptilus viverra (Walker, 1873)
- Holoptilus vulpes Stål, 1865

== Description ==
Members of this genus have widely separated ocelli, and the dorsum of the head behind the eyes is elevated in the middle. The antennae have four segments and the hemelytra are twice as long as the abdomen. The tarsi are two segmented.
