= Aradelloides =

Scientific classification
- Kingdom: Animalia
- Phylum: Arthropoda
- Class: Insecta
- Order: Hemiptera
- Suborder: Heteroptera
- Family: Reduviidae
- Subfamily: Holoptilinae
- Genus: Aradelloides; Malipatil, 1983

Genus of feather-legged bugs

Aradelloides is a genus of feather-legged bugs in the Holoptilinae subfamily. It is endemic to Australia and three species have been described.

== Species list ==
- Aradelloides maculatus Malipatil, 1983
- Aradelloides taylori Malipatil, 1983
- Aradelloides wilsoni Malipatil, 1983
