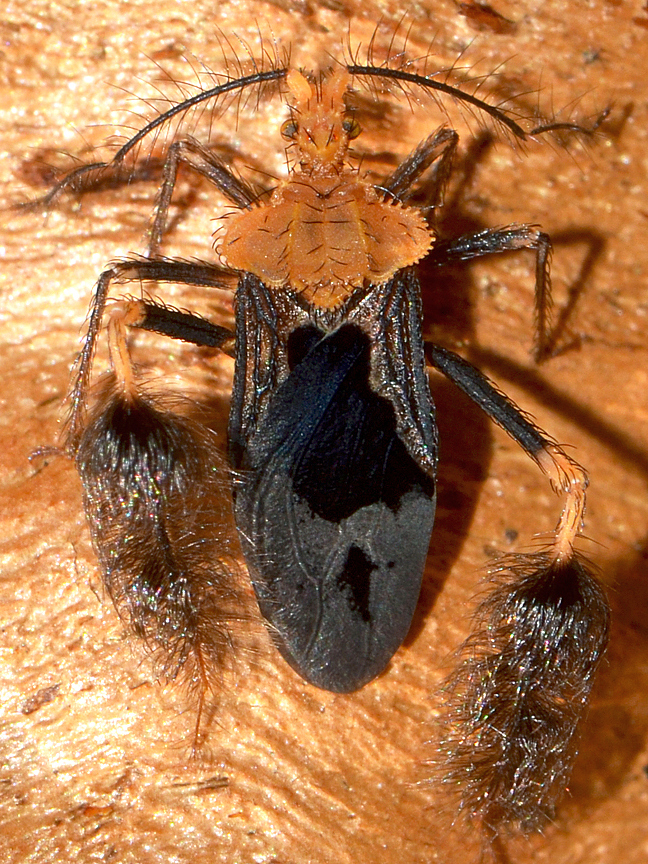

Scientific classification
- Kingdom: Animalia
- Phylum: Arthropoda
- Clade: Pancrustacea
- Class: Insecta
- Order: Hemiptera
- Suborder: Heteroptera
- Family: Reduviidae
- Genus: Ptilocnemus
- Species: P. lemur

Binomial name
- Ptilocnemus lemur (Westwood, 1840)

= Ptilocnemus lemur =

Species of true bug

Ptilocnemus lemur is a species of feather-legged bug in the family Reduviidae native to Australia. Commonly known as the feather-legged assassin bug, it is a predator with a specialized gland called a trichome that it uses to attract and paralyse ants before feeding on them.

== Description ==
Ptilocnemus lemur is a moderate sized assassin bug. It has a small head with a pair of feathery antennae with three segments, and a large down-curving proboscis, a wide thorax and a moderately broad abdomen. The wings have three veins. The hind pair of legs are much larger than the other two pairs and the tibiae of these are heavily clad with bristles. The head and thorax are yellowish-brown and the abdomen mottled grey and black.

== Distribution ==
Ptilocnemus lemur is native to Australia where it lives in forests. It can be found on the trunks of trees where its drab colours help to camouflage it as it stands on the bark.

== Biology ==
The trichome is a glandular structure on the ventral surface of the third abdominal segment. It produces a secretion that is attractive to ants and which paralyses them. In addition to this, there are glandular patches on the front few abdominal segments, and these patches, but not the trichome, are also present in nymphs of this species.

Both adults and nymphs of this assassin bug are specialist predators on ants. The feeding behaviour of the nymph has been closely studied. It stands near an ant trail and waves one of its hairy hind legs to attract the attention of a passing ant, the jack jumper ant (Myrmecia pilosula) often being targeted. The prey may be bigger than the nymph, and is also lured towards the bug by the release of a pheromone. When an ant approaches, the nymph raises its body so that the ant can taste the secretion produced by the trichome. The bug waits for the ant to grab its hind leg and then turns round and plunges the stylets in the proboscis into a weak spot in the ant's cuticle, the joint at the back of the head. It then jerks and shakes the ant around, perhaps to prevent it from biting, and injects saliva into the wound. The ant soon dies and the bug may carry it to a crevice or other concealed spot. When the body contents of the ant have liquefied, the bug sucks out the body fluids.
