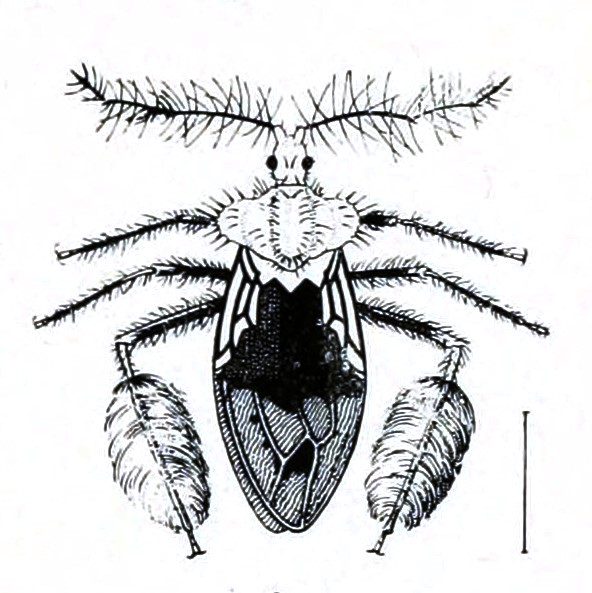
- Ptilocnemus femoralis

Scientific classification
- Kingdom: Animalia
- Phylum: Arthropoda
- Class: Insecta
- Order: Hemiptera
- Suborder: Heteroptera
- Family: Reduviidae
- Subfamily: Holoptilinae
- Tribe: Holoptilini
- Genus: Ptilocnemus; Westwood, 1840

Synonyms
- Ptilocnemidia Kirkaldy, 1902

= Ptilocnemus =

Genus of true bugs

Ptilocnemus is a genus of Australian feather-legged bugs in the Holoptilinae subfamily. At least 12 species have been described. These species have a specialized gland called a trichome that produces a chemical to attract and paralyze ants.

== Partial species list ==
- Ptilocnemus borealis Malipatil, 1985
- Ptilocnemus femoralis Horváth, 1902
- Ptilocnemus lemur (Westwood. 1840)
