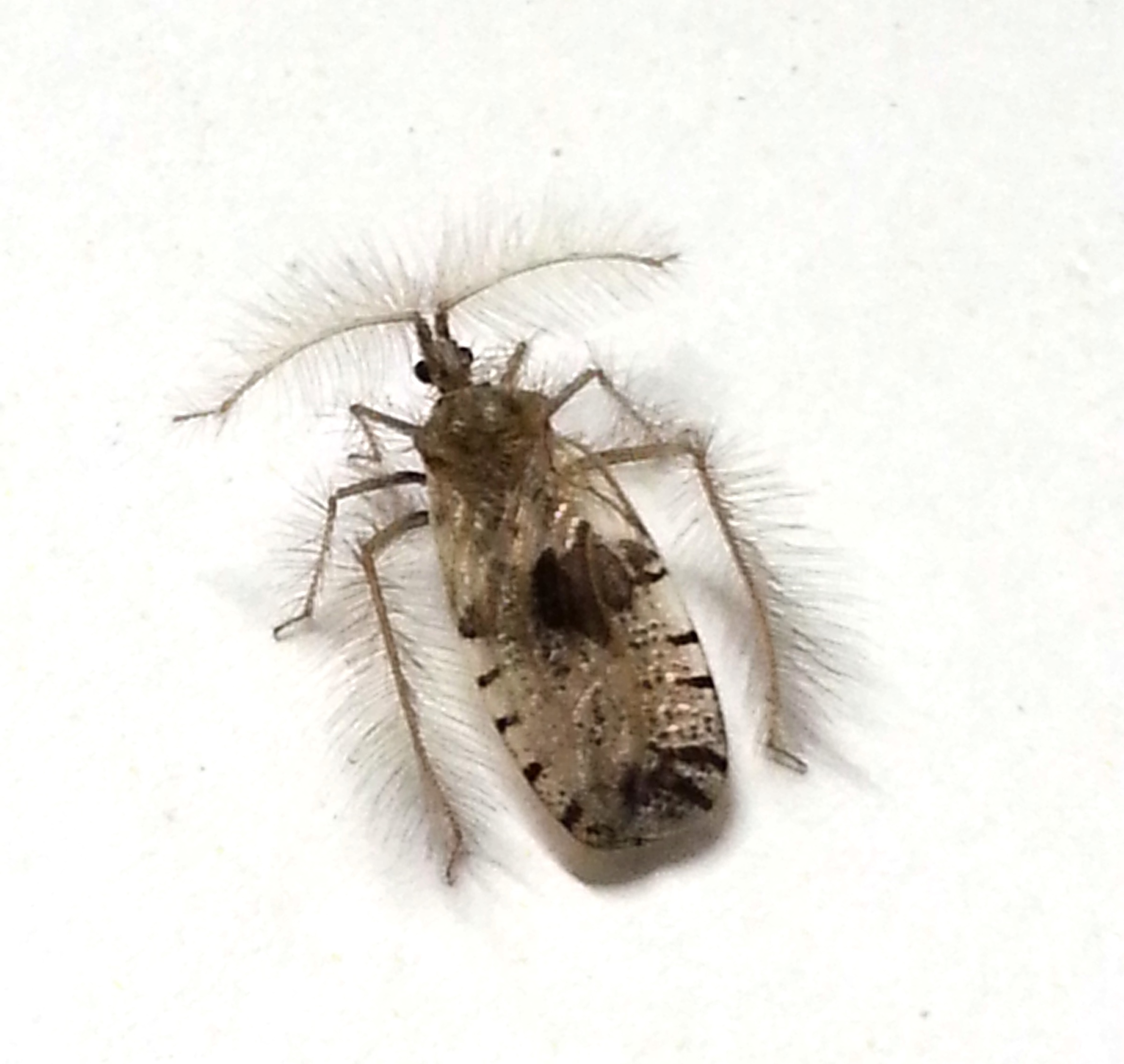
- Ant wolf or feather-legged bug, genus Holoptilus

Scientific classification
- Kingdom: Animalia
- Phylum: Arthropoda
- Clade: Pancrustacea
- Class: Insecta
- Order: Hemiptera
- Suborder: Heteroptera
- Family: Reduviidae
- Subfamily: Holoptilinae; Lepeletier and Serville, 1825

Tribes
- Aradellini; Dasycnemini; Holoptilini

= Holoptilinae =

Subfamily of true bugs

The Holoptilinae are a subfamily of Reduviidae (assassin bugs) known as feather-legged bugs or ant wolves. Several members of the subfamily specialize on ants. About 16 genera (one fossil) are known, with about 80 species described. Species in the Holoptilini tribe possess a specialized organ called a trichome to attract ants.

Three tribes are included in the subfamily - Aradellini, Dasycnemini, and Holoptilini.

== Genera ==
- Aradelloides Malipatil, 1983
- Aradellus Westwood
- Dasycnemus
- Holoptilus
- Holoptiloides
- Rudbeckocoris
- †Praecoris dominicana Poinar, 1991
- Ptilocerus
- Ptilocnemus Westwood
