= Dolichoderus vexillarius =

†Dolichoderus vexillarius Temporal range: Middle to Late Eocene Baltic amber

Scientific classification
- Domain: Eukaryota
- Kingdom: Animalia
- Phylum: Arthropoda
- Class: Insecta
- Order: Hymenoptera
- Family: Formicidae
- Subfamily: Dolichoderinae
- Genus: Dolichoderus
- Species: D. vexillarius

Binomial name
- Dolichoderus vexillarius Wheeler, W.M., 1915

Species of ant

Dolichoderus vexillarius is an extinct species of Eocene ant in the genus Dolichoderus. Described by William Morton Wheeler in 1915, a fossilised worker was found and described from the Baltic amber.
