= Dolichoderus tridentanodus =

Scientific classification
- Domain: Eukaryota
- Kingdom: Animalia
- Phylum: Arthropoda
- Class: Insecta
- Order: Hymenoptera
- Family: Formicidae
- Subfamily: Dolichoderinae
- Genus: Dolichoderus
- Species: D. tridentanodus

Binomial name
- Dolichoderus tridentanodus Ortega-De Santiago & Vásquez-Bolaños, 2012

Species of ant

Dolichoderus tridentanodus is a species of ant in the genus Dolichoderus. Described by Ortega-De Santiago and Vásquez-Bolaños in 2012, the species is endemic to Mexico.
