= Dolichoderus siggii =

Scientific classification
- Domain: Eukaryota
- Kingdom: Animalia
- Phylum: Arthropoda
- Class: Insecta
- Order: Hymenoptera
- Family: Formicidae
- Subfamily: Dolichoderinae
- Genus: Dolichoderus
- Species: D. siggii

Binomial name
- Dolichoderus siggii Forel, 1895

Species of ant

Dolichoderus siggii is a species of ant in the genus Dolichoderus. Described by Auguste-Henri Forel in 1895, the species is endemic to Thailand.
