= Dolichoderus laurae =

Scientific classification
- Kingdom: Animalia
- Phylum: Arthropoda
- Clade: Pancrustacea
- Class: Insecta
- Order: Hymenoptera
- Family: Formicidae
- Subfamily: Dolichoderinae
- Genus: Dolichoderus
- Species: D. laurae

Binomial name
- Dolichoderus laurae Mackay, W.P., 1993

Species of ant

Dolichoderus laurae is a species of ant that belongs to the subfamily Dolichoderinae. This species is endemic to Colombia.

== Taxonomy ==
This species was described by Mackay in 1993. It is a member of the D. diversus species complex.
