= Dolichoderus doloniger =

Scientific classification
- Domain: Eukaryota
- Kingdom: Animalia
- Phylum: Arthropoda
- Class: Insecta
- Order: Hymenoptera
- Family: Formicidae
- Subfamily: Dolichoderinae
- Genus: Dolichoderus
- Species: D. doloniger

Binomial name
- Dolichoderus doloniger (Roger, 1862)

Species of ant

Dolichoderus doloniger is a species of ant in the genus Dolichoderus. Described by Roger in 1862, the species is endemic to Bolivia and Venezuela.
