= Dolichoderus luederwaldti =

Scientific classification
- Kingdom: Animalia
- Phylum: Arthropoda
- Class: Insecta
- Order: Hymenoptera
- Family: Formicidae
- Subfamily: Dolichoderinae
- Genus: Dolichoderus
- Species: D. luederwaldti

Binomial name
- Dolichoderus luederwaldti Santschi, 1921

Species of ant

Dolichoderus luederwaldti is a species of ant in the genus Dolichoderus. Described by Felix Santschi in 1921, the species is endemic to Brazil.
