= Dolichoderus sagmanotus =

Scientific classification
- Domain: Eukaryota
- Kingdom: Animalia
- Phylum: Arthropoda
- Class: Insecta
- Order: Hymenoptera
- Family: Formicidae
- Subfamily: Dolichoderinae
- Genus: Dolichoderus
- Species: D. sagmanotus

Binomial name
- Dolichoderus sagmanotus Xu, 2001

Species of ant

Dolichoderus sagmanotus is a species of ant in the genus Dolichoderus. Described by Xu in 2001, the species is endemic to China.
