= Dolichoderus laminatus =

Scientific classification
- Domain: Eukaryota
- Kingdom: Animalia
- Phylum: Arthropoda
- Class: Insecta
- Order: Hymenoptera
- Family: Formicidae
- Subfamily: Dolichoderinae
- Genus: Dolichoderus
- Species: D. laminatus

Binomial name
- Dolichoderus laminatus (Mayr, 1870)

Synonyms
- Dolichoderus laminatus luteiventris Emery, 1894

Species of ant

Dolichoderus laminatus is a species of ant in the genus Dolichoderus. Described by Mayr in 1870, the species is endemic to many North and South American countries.
