= Dolichoderus gibbifer =

Scientific classification
- Domain: Eukaryota
- Kingdom: Animalia
- Phylum: Arthropoda
- Class: Insecta
- Order: Hymenoptera
- Family: Formicidae
- Subfamily: Dolichoderinae
- Genus: Dolichoderus
- Species: D. gibbifer

Binomial name
- Dolichoderus gibbifer Emery, 1887

Synonyms
- Dolichoderus gibbifer gibbosior Forel, 1912

Species of ant

Dolichoderus gibbifer is a species of ant in the genus Dolichoderus. Described by Emery in 1887, the species is endemic to Indonesia.
