= Dolichoderus superaculus =

Scientific classification
- Domain: Eukaryota
- Kingdom: Animalia
- Phylum: Arthropoda
- Class: Insecta
- Order: Hymenoptera
- Family: Formicidae
- Subfamily: Dolichoderinae
- Genus: Dolichoderus
- Species: D. superaculus

Binomial name
- Dolichoderus superaculus (Lattke, 1987)

Species of ant

Dolichoderus superaculus is a species of ant in the genus Dolichoderus. Described by Lattke in 1987, the species is endemic to Colombia.
