= Dolichoderus etus =

Scientific classification
- Kingdom: Animalia
- Phylum: Arthropoda
- Class: Insecta
- Order: Hymenoptera
- Family: Formicidae
- Subfamily: Dolichoderinae
- Genus: Dolichoderus
- Species: D. etus

Binomial name
- Dolichoderus etus Shattuck & Marsden, 2013

Species of ant

Dolichoderus etus is a species of ant in the genus Dolichoderus. Described by Shattuck and Marsden in 2013, the species is known from coastal New South Wales where it can be found in both wet and dry sclerophyll land, and they also nest in soil under rocks.
