= Dolichoderus intermedius =

†Dolichoderus intermedius Temporal range: Early Miocene Dominican amber

Scientific classification
- Domain: Eukaryota
- Kingdom: Animalia
- Phylum: Arthropoda
- Class: Insecta
- Order: Hymenoptera
- Family: Formicidae
- Subfamily: Dolichoderinae
- Genus: Dolichoderus
- Species: D. intermedius

Binomial name
- Dolichoderus intermedius Mackay, W.P., 1993

Species of ant

Dolichoderus intermedius is an extinct species of Miocene ant in the genus Dolichoderus. Described by Mackay in 1993, a fossilised worker was found in the Dominican amber, although the specific locality has not been given.
