= Dolichoderus oviformis =

†Dolichoderus oviformis Temporal range: Oligocene

Scientific classification
- Domain: Eukaryota
- Kingdom: Animalia
- Phylum: Arthropoda
- Class: Insecta
- Order: Hymenoptera
- Family: Formicidae
- Subfamily: Dolichoderinae
- Genus: Dolichoderus
- Species: D. oviformis

Binomial name
- Dolichoderus oviformis Théobald, 1937

Species of ant

Dolichoderus oviformis is an extinct species of Oligocene ant in the genus Dolichoderus. Described by Théobald in 1937, fossilised males and queens were found in France and have been described.
