= Dolichoderus pilipes =

†Dolichoderus pilipes Middle to Late Eocene Rovno amber and the Scandinavian amber

Scientific classification
- Domain: Eukaryota
- Kingdom: Animalia
- Phylum: Arthropoda
- Class: Insecta
- Order: Hymenoptera
- Family: Formicidae
- Subfamily: Dolichoderinae
- Genus: Dolichoderus
- Species: D. pilipes

Binomial name
- Dolichoderus pilipes Dlussky, 2008

Species of ant

Dolichoderus pilipes is an extinct species of Eocene ant in the genus Dolichoderus. Described by Dlussky in 2008, fossils of the species have been found in multiple ambers, notably the Rovno amber and the Scandinavian amber.
