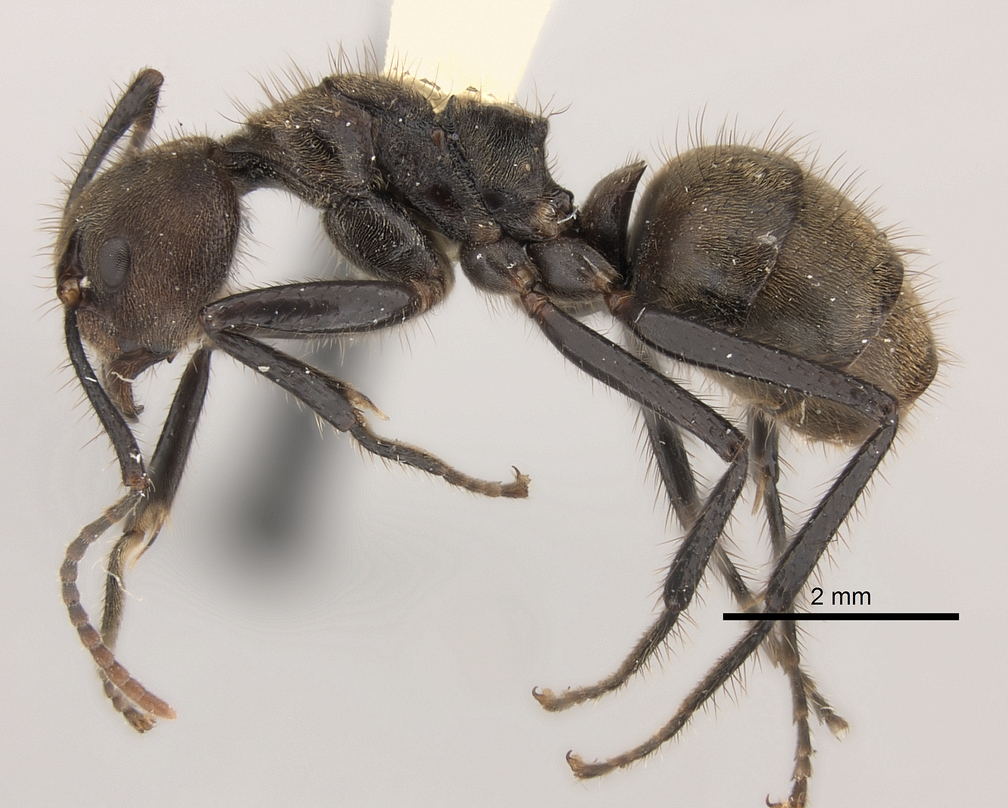

Scientific classification
- Kingdom: Animalia
- Phylum: Arthropoda
- Class: Insecta
- Order: Hymenoptera
- Family: Formicidae
- Subfamily: Dolichoderinae
- Genus: Dolichoderus
- Species: D. bidens

Binomial name
- Dolichoderus bidens (Linnaeus, 1758)

Synonyms
- Dolichoderus auromaculatus Forel, 1885; Dolichoderus bidens attenuatus Forel, 1903; Dolichoderus bidens bahiana Santschi, 1921; Formica perditor Fabricius, 1804

= Dolichoderus bidens =

Species of ant

Dolichoderus bidens is a species of ant in the genus Dolichoderus. Described by Carl Linnaeus in his 1758 10th edition of Systema Naturae, the species is endemic to Brazil, Ecuador, French Guiana, Guyana, Suriname and Trinidad and Tobago.
