= Dolichoderus semiorbis =

Scientific classification
- Kingdom: Animalia
- Phylum: Arthropoda
- Class: Insecta
- Order: Hymenoptera
- Family: Formicidae
- Subfamily: Dolichoderinae
- Genus: Dolichoderus
- Species: D. semiorbis

Binomial name
- Dolichoderus semiorbis Shattuck & Marsden, 2013

Species of ant

Dolichoderus semiorbis is a species of ant in Dolichoderus. Described by Shattuck and Marsden in 2013, the species is endemic to Australia.
