= Dolichoderus brevipennis =

†Dolichoderus brevipennis Temporal range: Late Oligocene Bitterfeld amber

Scientific classification
- Domain: Eukaryota
- Kingdom: Animalia
- Phylum: Arthropoda
- Class: Insecta
- Order: Hymenoptera
- Family: Formicidae
- Subfamily: Dolichoderinae
- Genus: Dolichoderus
- Species: D. brevipennis

Binomial name
- Dolichoderus brevipennis Dlussky, 2008

Species of ant

Dolichoderus brevipennis is an extinct species of ant in the genus Dolichoderus. Described by Dlussky in 2008, the fossils were found in the Bitterfeld amber.
