= Dolichoderus vlaskini =

†Dolichoderus vlaskini Temporal range: Eocene

Scientific classification
- Domain: Eukaryota
- Kingdom: Animalia
- Phylum: Arthropoda
- Class: Insecta
- Order: Hymenoptera
- Family: Formicidae
- Subfamily: Dolichoderinae
- Genus: Dolichoderus
- Species: D. vlaskini

Binomial name
- Dolichoderus vlaskini Dlussky, 2008

Species of ant

Dolichoderus vlaskini is an extinct species of ant in the genus Dolichoderus. Described by Dlussky and Perkovsky in 2002, the fossils were discovered in the Rovno amber, located in Ukraine.
