= Dolichoderus ghilianii =

Scientific classification
- Domain: Eukaryota
- Kingdom: Animalia
- Phylum: Arthropoda
- Class: Insecta
- Order: Hymenoptera
- Family: Formicidae
- Subfamily: Dolichoderinae
- Genus: Dolichoderus
- Species: D. ghilianii

Binomial name
- Dolichoderus ghilianii Emery, 1894

Species of ant

Dolichoderus ghilianii is a species of ant in the genus Dolichoderus. Described by Emery in 1894, the species is endemic to Brazil, and Peru.
