= Dolichoderus primitivus =

†Dolichoderus primitivus Temporal range: Early Miocene Dominican amber

Scientific classification
- Domain: Eukaryota
- Kingdom: Animalia
- Phylum: Arthropoda
- Class: Insecta
- Order: Hymenoptera
- Family: Formicidae
- Subfamily: Dolichoderinae
- Genus: Dolichoderus
- Species: D. primitivus

Binomial name
- Dolichoderus primitivus (Wilson, 1985)

Species of ant

Dolichoderus primitivus is an extinct species of Miocene ant in the genus Dolichoderus. The fossils were found in the Dominican Amber, and was described by Wilson in 1985.
