= Dolichoderus tauricus =

†Dolichoderus tauricus Temporal range: Miocene

Scientific classification
- Kingdom: Animalia
- Phylum: Arthropoda
- Class: Insecta
- Order: Hymenoptera
- Family: Formicidae
- Subfamily: Dolichoderinae
- Genus: Dolichoderus
- Species: D. tauricus

Binomial name
- Dolichoderus tauricus Dlussky, 1981

Species of ant

Dolichoderus tauricus is an extant species of Miocene ant in the genus Dolichoderus. Described by Dlussky in 1981, the fossils were found in Russia.
