= Dolichoderus luridivenosus =

†Dolichoderus luridivenosus Temporal range: Miocene

Scientific classification
- Kingdom: Animalia
- Phylum: Arthropoda
- Class: Insecta
- Order: Hymenoptera
- Family: Formicidae
- Subfamily: Dolichoderinae
- Genus: Dolichoderus
- Species: D. luridivenosus

Binomial name
- Dolichoderus luridivenosus Zhang, Sun & Zhang, 1994

Species of ant

Dolichoderus luridivenosus is an extinct species of Miocene ant in the genus Dolichoderus. Described by Zhang, Sun and Zhang in 1994, the species was discovered after a fossil of a queen was found in China.
