= Dolichoderus andinus =

Scientific classification
- Domain: Eukaryota
- Kingdom: Animalia
- Phylum: Arthropoda
- Class: Insecta
- Order: Hymenoptera
- Family: Formicidae
- Subfamily: Dolichoderinae
- Genus: Dolichoderus
- Species: D. andinus

Binomial name
- Dolichoderus andinus (Kempf, 1962)

Species of ant

Dolichoderus andinus is a species of ant in the genus Dolichoderus. Described by Kempf in 1962, the species is only endemic to Peru.
