= Dolichoderus baenae =

Scientific classification
- Domain: Eukaryota
- Kingdom: Animalia
- Phylum: Arthropoda
- Class: Insecta
- Order: Hymenoptera
- Family: Formicidae
- Subfamily: Dolichoderinae
- Genus: Dolichoderus
- Species: D. baenae

Binomial name
- Dolichoderus baenae Mackay, W.P., 1993

Species of ant

Dolichoderus baenae is a species of ant in the genus Dolichoderus. Described by Mackay in 1993, the species is endemic to Colombia.
