= Dolichoderus rosenbergi =

Scientific classification
- Domain: Eukaryota
- Kingdom: Animalia
- Phylum: Arthropoda
- Class: Insecta
- Order: Hymenoptera
- Family: Formicidae
- Subfamily: Dolichoderinae
- Genus: Dolichoderus
- Species: D. rosenbergi

Binomial name
- Dolichoderus rosenbergi Forel, 1911

Species of ant

Dolichoderus rosenbergi is a species of ant in the genus Dolichoderus. Described by Auguste-Henri Forel in 1911, the species is endemic to Ecuador.
