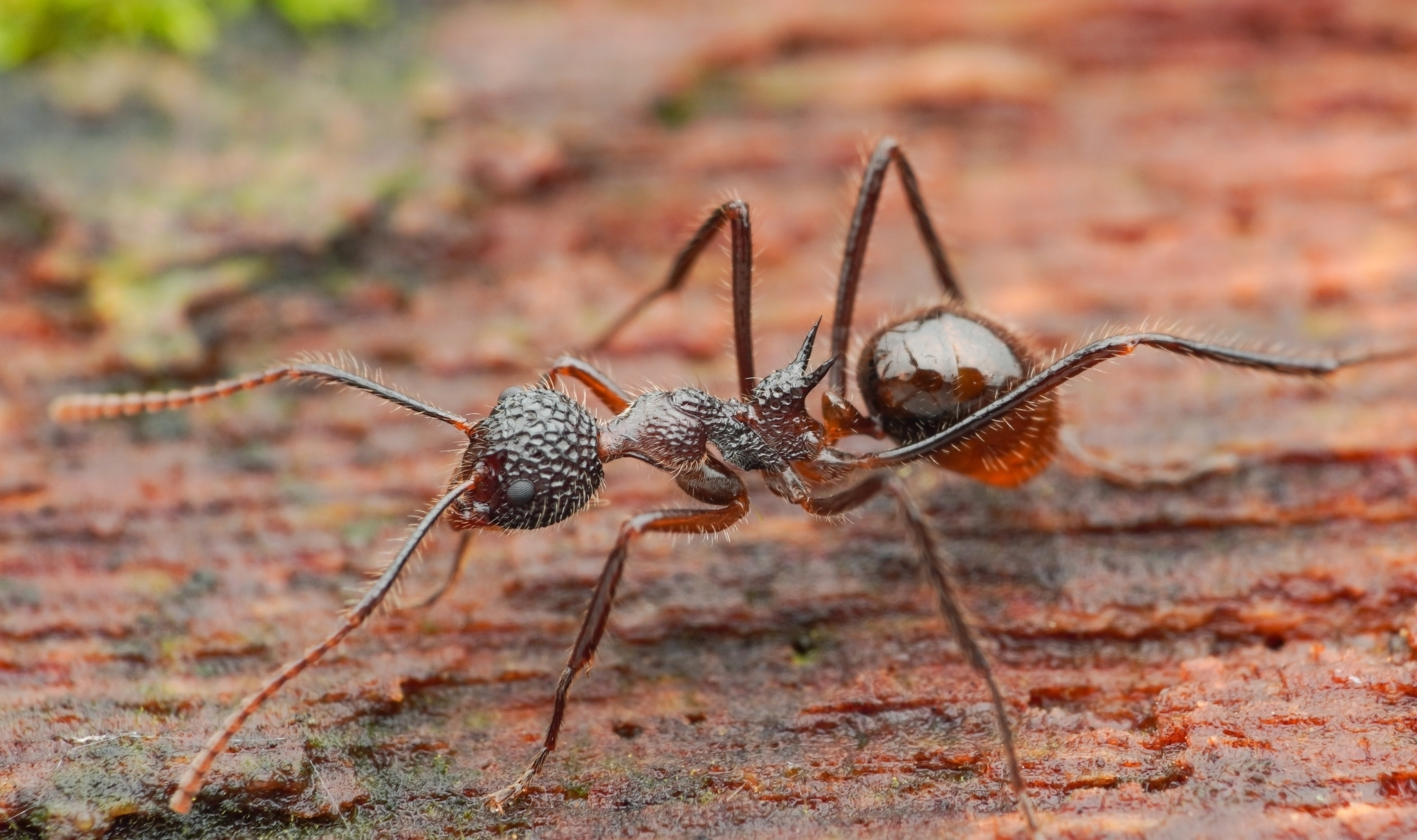
- Dolichoderus indrapurensis

Scientific classification
- Domain: Eukaryota
- Kingdom: Animalia
- Phylum: Arthropoda
- Class: Insecta
- Order: Hymenoptera
- Family: Formicidae
- Subfamily: Dolichoderinae
- Genus: Dolichoderus
- Species: D. indrapurensis

Binomial name
- Dolichoderus indrapurensis Forel, 1912

Subspecies
- Dolichoderus indrapurensis nigrogaster Viehmeyer, 1922

= Dolichoderus indrapurensis =

Species of ant

Dolichoderus indrapurensis is a species of ant in the genus Dolichoderus. Described by Auguste-Henri Forel in 1912, the species is endemic to Borneo and Indonesia.
