= Dolichoderus jacobsoni =

Scientific classification
- Domain: Eukaryota
- Kingdom: Animalia
- Phylum: Arthropoda
- Class: Insecta
- Order: Hymenoptera
- Family: Formicidae
- Subfamily: Dolichoderinae
- Genus: Dolichoderus
- Species: D. jacobsoni

Binomial name
- Dolichoderus jacobsoni Forel, 1909

Species of ant

Dolichoderus jacobsoni is a species of ant in the genus Dolichoderus. Described by Auguste-Henri Forel in 1909, the species is endemic to Indonesia.
