= Dolichoderus spinicollis =

Scientific classification
- Kingdom: Animalia
- Phylum: Arthropoda
- Class: Insecta
- Order: Hymenoptera
- Family: Formicidae
- Subfamily: Dolichoderinae
- Genus: Dolichoderus
- Species: D. spinicollis

Binomial name
- Dolichoderus spinicollis (Latreille, 1817)

Species of ant

Dolichoderus spinicollis is a species of ant in the genus Dolichoderus. Described by Pierre André Latreille in 1817, the species is endemic to Brazil and Venezuela.
