= Dolichoderus pilosus =

Scientific classification
- Domain: Eukaryota
- Kingdom: Animalia
- Phylum: Arthropoda
- Class: Insecta
- Order: Hymenoptera
- Family: Formicidae
- Subfamily: Dolichoderinae
- Genus: Dolichoderus
- Species: D. pilosus

Binomial name
- Dolichoderus pilosus Zhou & Zheng, 1997

Species of ant

Dolichoderus pilosus is a species of ant in the genus Dolichoderus. Described by Zhou and Zheng in 1997, the species is endemic to China.
