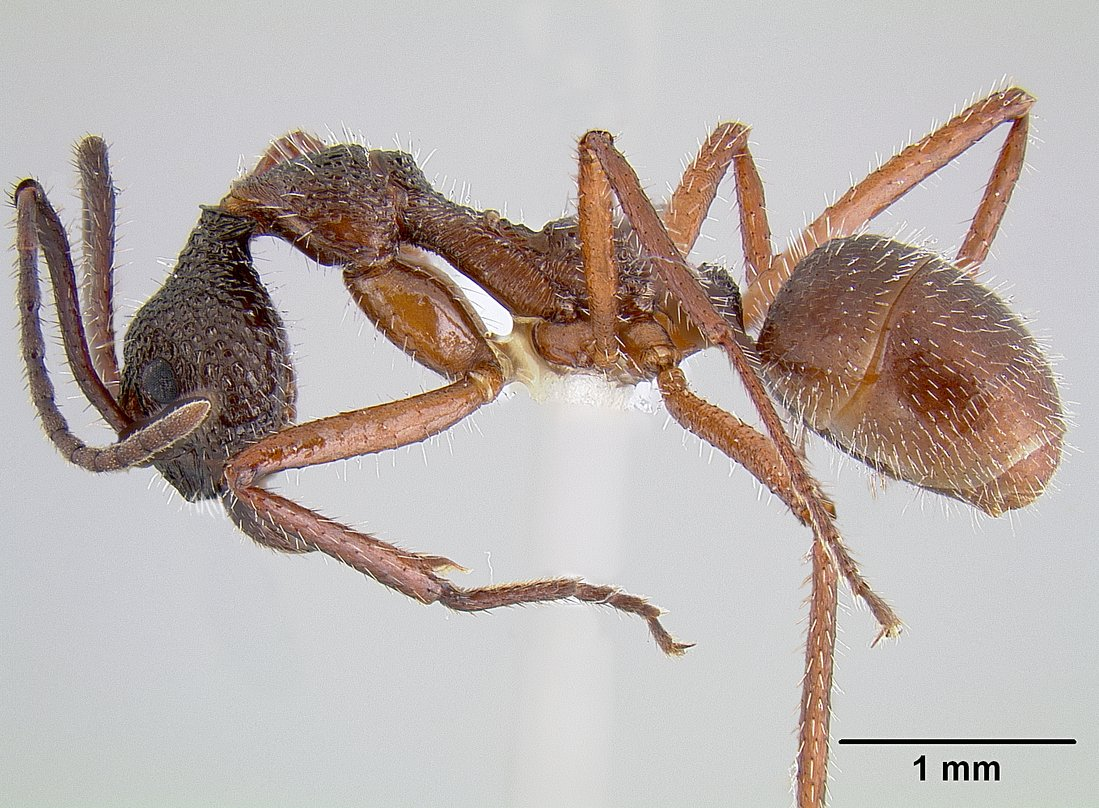

Scientific classification
- Domain: Eukaryota
- Kingdom: Animalia
- Phylum: Arthropoda
- Class: Insecta
- Order: Hymenoptera
- Family: Formicidae
- Subfamily: Dolichoderinae
- Genus: Dolichoderus
- Species: D. attelaboides

Binomial name
- Dolichoderus attelaboides (Fabricius, 1775)

Synonyms
- Dolichoderus attelaboides pulla Santschi, 1923; Dolichoderus imbecillus Mann, 1916; Dolichoderus imbecillus heterogaster Santschi, 1923

= Dolichoderus attelaboides =

Species of ant

Dolichoderus attelaboides is a species of ant in the genus Dolichoderus. Described by Danish zoologist Johan Christian Fabricius in 1775, the species is endemic to Bolivia, Brazil, Ecuador, French Guiana, Guyana, Peru, Suriname and Trinidad and Tobago.
