= Dolichoderus perkovskyi =

†Dolichoderus perkovskyi Middle to Late Eocene Rovno amber and the Scandinavian amber

Scientific classification
- Domain: Eukaryota
- Kingdom: Animalia
- Phylum: Arthropoda
- Class: Insecta
- Order: Hymenoptera
- Family: Formicidae
- Subfamily: Dolichoderinae
- Genus: Dolichoderus
- Species: D. perkovskyi

Binomial name
- Dolichoderus perkovskyi Dlussky, 2008

Species of ant

Dolichoderus perkovskyi is an extinct species of Eocene ant in the genus Dolichoderus. Described by Dlussky in 2008, fossils of the species have been found in multiple ambers, notably the Rovno amber and the Scandinavian amber.
