= Dolichoderus extensispinus =

Scientific classification
- Kingdom: Animalia
- Phylum: Arthropoda
- Class: Insecta
- Order: Hymenoptera
- Family: Formicidae
- Subfamily: Dolichoderinae
- Genus: Dolichoderus
- Species: D. extensispinus

Binomial name
- Dolichoderus extensispinus Forel, 1915

Species of ant

Dolichoderus extensispinus is a species of ant in the genus Dolichoderus. Described by Auguste-Henri Forel in 1915, the species is endemic to Australia, and can be found in dry sclerophyll areas to forestry regions in Queensland, where they nest under stones and forage on low vegetation and trees.
