= Dolichoderus rugosus =

Scientific classification
- Domain: Eukaryota
- Kingdom: Animalia
- Phylum: Arthropoda
- Class: Insecta
- Order: Hymenoptera
- Family: Formicidae
- Subfamily: Dolichoderinae
- Genus: Dolichoderus
- Species: D. rugosus

Binomial name
- Dolichoderus rugosus (Smith, F., 1858)

Species of ant

Dolichoderus rugosus is a species of ant in the genus Dolichoderus. Described by Smith in 1858, the species is endemic to South America.
