= Dolichoderus piceus =

Scientific classification
- Domain: Eukaryota
- Kingdom: Animalia
- Phylum: Arthropoda
- Class: Insecta
- Order: Hymenoptera
- Family: Formicidae
- Subfamily: Dolichoderinae
- Genus: Dolichoderus
- Species: D. piceus

Binomial name
- Dolichoderus piceus Mackay, W.P., 1993

Species of ant

Dolichoderus piceus is a species of ant in the genus Dolichoderus. Described by Mackay in 1993, the species is only known in Colombia.
