= Dolichoderus satanus =

Scientific classification
- Domain: Eukaryota
- Kingdom: Animalia
- Phylum: Arthropoda
- Class: Insecta
- Order: Hymenoptera
- Family: Formicidae
- Subfamily: Dolichoderinae
- Genus: Dolichoderus
- Species: D. satanus

Binomial name
- Dolichoderus satanus Bolton, 1995

Synonyms
- Formica obscura Smith, F., 1858

Species of ant

Dolichoderus satanus is a species of ant in the genus Dolichoderus. Described by Bolton in 1995, the species is endemic to Brazil.
