= Dolichoderus patens =

Scientific classification
- Domain: Eukaryota
- Kingdom: Animalia
- Phylum: Arthropoda
- Class: Insecta
- Order: Hymenoptera
- Family: Formicidae
- Subfamily: Dolichoderinae
- Genus: Dolichoderus
- Species: D. patens

Binomial name
- Dolichoderus patens (Mayr, 1870)

Subspecies
- Dolichoderus patens pubiventris Emery, 1900

Species of ant

Dolichoderus patens is a species of ant in the genus Dolichoderus. Described by Mayr in 1870, the species is endemic to Borneo.
