= Dolichoderus crawleyi =

Scientific classification
- Domain: Eukaryota
- Kingdom: Animalia
- Phylum: Arthropoda
- Class: Insecta
- Order: Hymenoptera
- Family: Formicidae
- Subfamily: Dolichoderinae
- Genus: Dolichoderus
- Species: D. crawleyi

Binomial name
- Dolichoderus crawleyi Donisthorpe, 1917

Species of ant

Dolichoderus crawleyi is a species of ant in the genus Dolichoderus. Described by Horace Donisthorpe in 1917, the species is endemic to Singapore.
