= Dolichoderus clusor =

Scientific classification
- Kingdom: Animalia
- Phylum: Arthropoda
- Class: Insecta
- Order: Hymenoptera
- Family: Formicidae
- Subfamily: Dolichoderinae
- Genus: Dolichoderus
- Species: D. clusor

Binomial name
- Dolichoderus clusor Forel, 1907

Species of ant

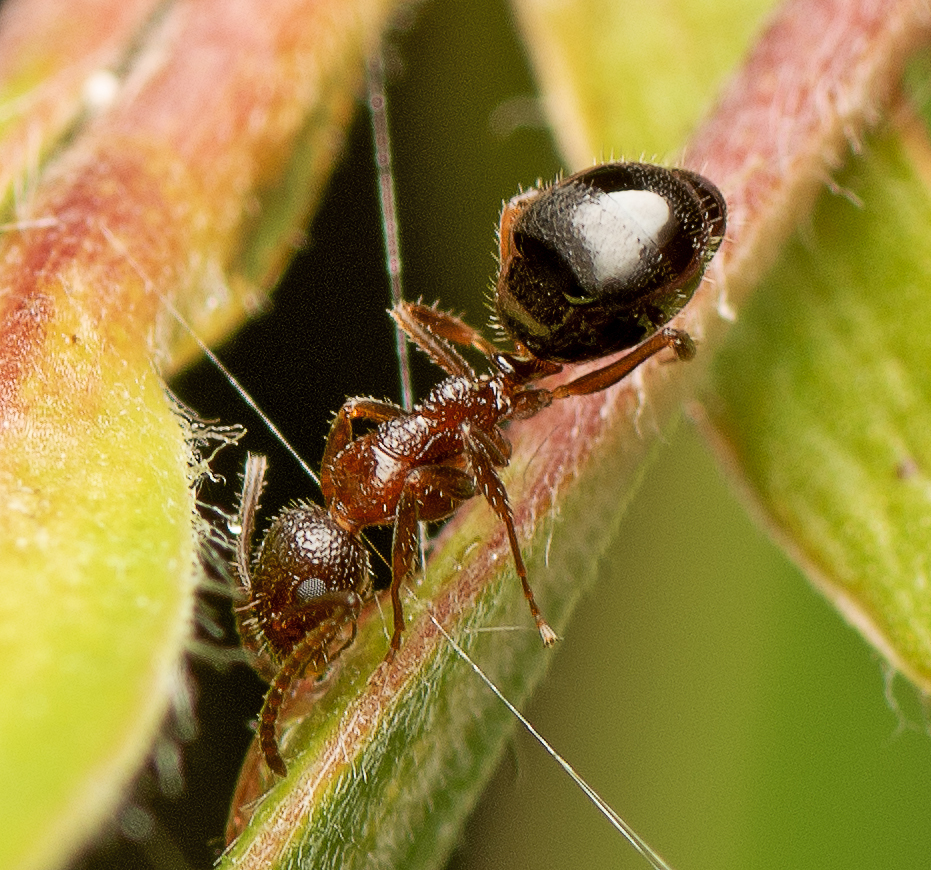

Dolichoderus clusor is a species of ant in the genus Dolichoderus. Described by Auguste-Henri Forel in 1907, the species mostly live in dry sclerophyll and forages on tree trunks. Populations are known from Western Australia and South Australia. Ants of this species have been observed nesting under masses of dead grass, which were located under a stone.
