= Dolichoderus tuberifer =

Scientific classification
- Domain: Eukaryota
- Kingdom: Animalia
- Phylum: Arthropoda
- Class: Insecta
- Order: Hymenoptera
- Family: Formicidae
- Subfamily: Dolichoderinae
- Genus: Dolichoderus
- Species: D. tuberifer

Binomial name
- Dolichoderus tuberifer Emery, 1887

Species of ant

Dolichoderus tuberifer is a species of ant in the genus Dolichoderus. Described by Emery in 1887, the species is endemic to Indonesia and Thailand.
