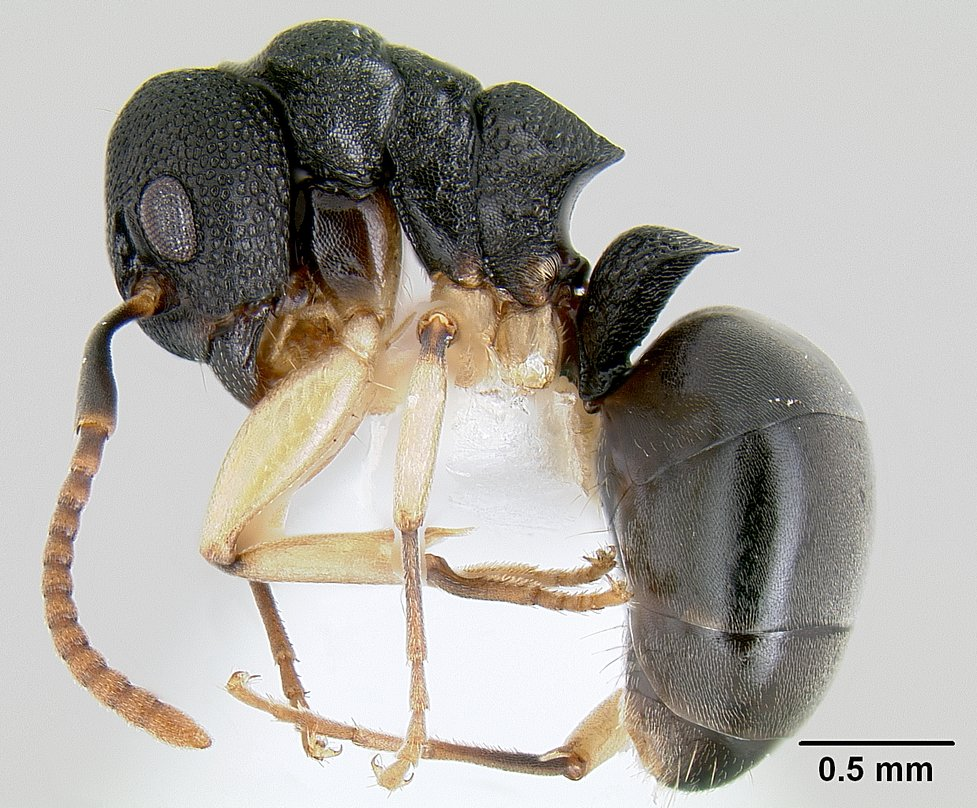

Scientific classification
- Domain: Eukaryota
- Kingdom: Animalia
- Phylum: Arthropoda
- Class: Insecta
- Order: Hymenoptera
- Family: Formicidae
- Subfamily: Dolichoderinae
- Genus: Dolichoderus
- Species: D. lamellosus

Binomial name
- Dolichoderus lamellosus (Mayr, 1870)

Synonyms
- Dolichoderus lamellosa missionensis Santschi, 1916

= Dolichoderus lamellosus =

Species of ant

Dolichoderus lamellosus is a species of ant in the genus Dolichoderus. Described by Mayr in 1870, the species is endemic to many South American countries, including Argentina, Bolivia, Colombia, Costa Rica, Ecuador, French Guiana, Guyana, Honduras, Paraguay, Suriname and Venezuela.
