= Dolichoderus explicans =

†Dolichoderus explicans Temporal range: Oligocene

Scientific classification
- Domain: Eukaryota
- Kingdom: Animalia
- Phylum: Arthropoda
- Class: Insecta
- Order: Hymenoptera
- Family: Formicidae
- Subfamily: Dolichoderinae
- Genus: Dolichoderus
- Species: D. explicans

Binomial name
- Dolichoderus explicans (Förster, 1891)

Species of ant

Dolichoderus explicans is an extinct species of Oligocene ant in the genus Dolichoderus. Described by Förster, 1891, a fossilised queen was discovered in Germany.
