= Dolichoderus nigricornis =

Scientific classification
- Kingdom: Animalia
- Phylum: Arthropoda
- Class: Insecta
- Order: Hymenoptera
- Family: Formicidae
- Subfamily: Dolichoderinae
- Genus: Dolichoderus
- Species: D. nigricornis

Binomial name
- Dolichoderus nigricornis Clark, 1930

Species of ant

Dolichoderus nigricornis is a species of ant in the genus Dolichoderus. Described by John S. Clark in 1930, the species is endemic to Australia and is widespread, and known from dry sclerophyll woodland and forages on trees. Their nests can be found in soil, typically under rocks.
