= Dolichoderus granulinotus =

†Dolichoderus granulinotus Temporal range: Middle to Late Eocene Baltic amber

Scientific classification
- Domain: Eukaryota
- Kingdom: Animalia
- Phylum: Arthropoda
- Class: Insecta
- Order: Hymenoptera
- Family: Formicidae
- Subfamily: Dolichoderinae
- Genus: Dolichoderus
- Species: D. granulinotus

Binomial name
- Dolichoderus granulinotus Dlussky, 2008

Species of ant

Dolichoderus granulinotus is an extinct species of Eocene ant in the genus Dolichoderus. Described by Dlussky in 2008, the species fossils were discovered in the Baltic amber.
