= Dolichoderus brevipalpis =

Dolichoderus brevipalpis Temporal range: Middle to Late Eocene

Scientific classification
- Domain: Eukaryota
- Kingdom: Animalia
- Phylum: Arthropoda
- Class: Insecta
- Order: Hymenoptera
- Family: Formicidae
- Subfamily: Dolichoderinae
- Genus: Dolichoderus
- Species: †D. brevipalpis

Binomial name
- †Dolichoderus brevipalpis Dlussky, 2008

Species of ant

Dolichoderus brevipalpis is an extinct species of ant in the genus Dolichoderus. Described by Dlussky in 2008, the ant is from the Eocene epoch, being discovered in the Baltic Amber.
