= Dolichoderus dajiensis =

Scientific classification
- Domain: Eukaryota
- Kingdom: Animalia
- Phylum: Arthropoda
- Class: Insecta
- Order: Hymenoptera
- Family: Formicidae
- Subfamily: Dolichoderinae
- Genus: Dolichoderus
- Species: D. dajiensis

Binomial name
- Dolichoderus dajiensis Wang, W. & Zheng, 2005

Species of ant

Dolichoderus dajiensis is a species of ant in the genus Dolichoderus. Described by Wang and Zheng in 2005, the species is only known from a mountainous in eastern China, and these specimens at elevations at 930 m (3051 ft).
