= Dolichoderus brevis =

Scientific classification
- Kingdom: Animalia
- Phylum: Arthropoda
- Class: Insecta
- Order: Hymenoptera
- Family: Formicidae
- Subfamily: Dolichoderinae
- Genus: Dolichoderus
- Species: D. brevis

Binomial name
- Dolichoderus brevis Santschi, 1920

Species of ant

Dolichoderus brevis is a species of ant in the genus Dolichoderus. Described by Santschi in 1920, the species is endemic to Laos.
