= Dolichoderus tristis =

Scientific classification
- Domain: Eukaryota
- Kingdom: Animalia
- Phylum: Arthropoda
- Class: Insecta
- Order: Hymenoptera
- Family: Formicidae
- Subfamily: Dolichoderinae
- Genus: Dolichoderus
- Species: D. tristis

Binomial name
- Dolichoderus tristis W. M. Mann, 1916

Species of ant

Dolichoderus tristis is a species of ant in the genus Dolichoderus. Described by William M. Mann in 1916, the species is endemic to Brazil and Peru.
