= Dolichoderus tricornis =

Scientific classification
- Domain: Eukaryota
- Kingdom: Animalia
- Phylum: Arthropoda
- Class: Insecta
- Order: Hymenoptera
- Family: Formicidae
- Subfamily: Dolichoderinae
- Genus: Dolichoderus
- Species: D. tricornis

Binomial name
- Dolichoderus tricornis Emery, 1897

Species of ant

Dolichoderus tricornis is a species of ant in the genus Dolichoderus. Described by Emery in 1897, the species is endemic to New Guinea.
