= Dolichoderus sundari =

Scientific classification
- Domain: Eukaryota
- Kingdom: Animalia
- Phylum: Arthropoda
- Class: Insecta
- Order: Hymenoptera
- Family: Formicidae
- Subfamily: Dolichoderinae
- Genus: Dolichoderus
- Species: D. sundari

Binomial name
- Dolichoderus sundari Mathew & Tiwari, 2000

Species of ant

Dolichoderus sundari is a species of ant in the genus Dolichoderus. Described by Mathew and Tiwari in 2000, the species is endemic to India.
