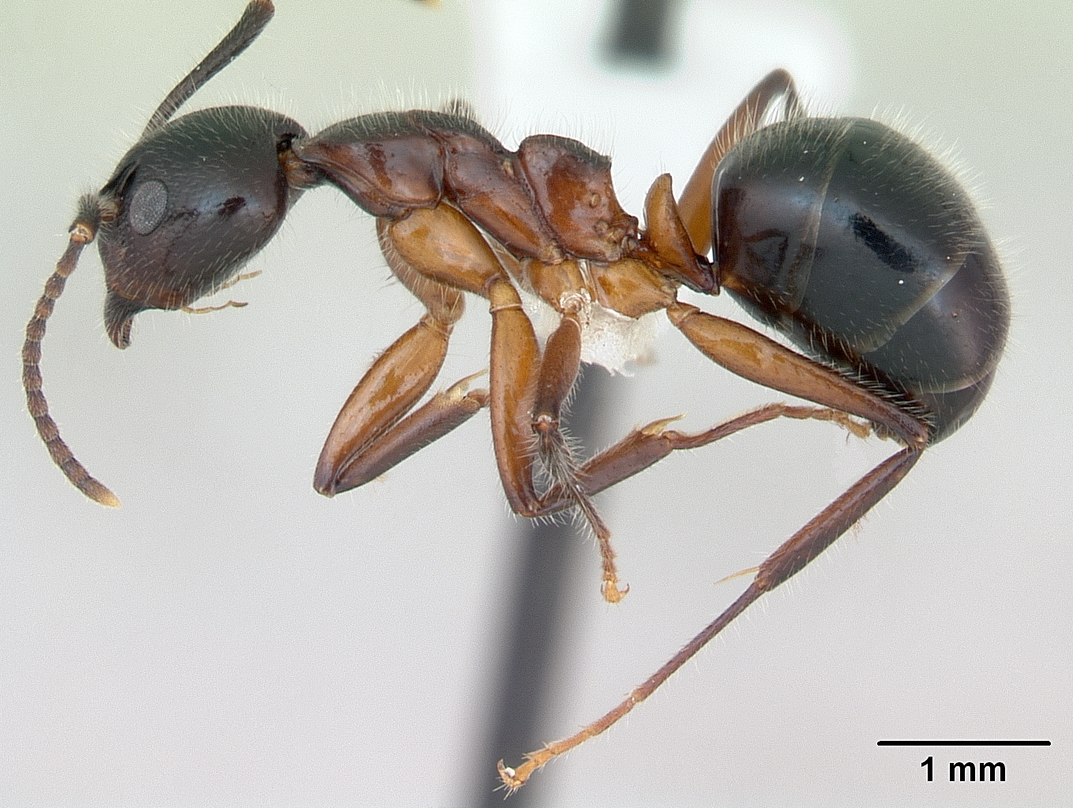

Scientific classification
- Domain: Eukaryota
- Kingdom: Animalia
- Phylum: Arthropoda
- Class: Insecta
- Order: Hymenoptera
- Family: Formicidae
- Subfamily: Dolichoderinae
- Genus: Dolichoderus
- Species: D. germaini

Binomial name
- Dolichoderus germaini Emery, 1894

= Dolichoderus germaini =

Species of ant

Dolichoderus germaini is a species of ant in the genus Dolichoderus. Described by Emery in 1894, the species is endemic to Brazil, Mexico, Paraguay and Peru.
