= Dolichoderus dibolius =

†Dolichoderus dibolius Temporal range: Early Miocene Dominican amber

Scientific classification
- Domain: Eukaryota
- Kingdom: Animalia
- Phylum: Arthropoda
- Class: Insecta
- Order: Hymenoptera
- Family: Formicidae
- Subfamily: Dolichoderinae
- Genus: Dolichoderus
- Species: D. dibolius

Binomial name
- Dolichoderus dibolius Wilson, 1985

Species of ant

Dolichoderus dibolius is an extinct species of Miocene ant in the genus Dolichoderus. The fossils were found in the Dominican Amber, and was described by Wilson in 1985.
