= Dolichoderus affectus =

†Dolichoderus affectus Temporal range: Oligocene

Scientific classification
- Domain: Eukaryota
- Kingdom: Animalia
- Phylum: Arthropoda
- Class: Insecta
- Order: Hymenoptera
- Family: Formicidae
- Subfamily: Dolichoderinae
- Genus: Dolichoderus
- Species: D. affectus

Binomial name
- Dolichoderus affectus Théobald, 1937

Species of ant

Dolichoderus affectus is an extinct species of ant in the genus Dolichoderus. Described by Théobald in 1937, the fossils were discovered in France.
