= Dolichoderus reflexus =

Scientific classification
- Kingdom: Animalia
- Phylum: Arthropoda
- Class: Insecta
- Order: Hymenoptera
- Family: Formicidae
- Subfamily: Dolichoderinae
- Genus: Dolichoderus
- Species: D. reflexus

Binomial name
- Dolichoderus reflexus Clark, 1930

Synonyms
- Dolichoderus armstrongi McAreavey, 1949

Species of ant

Dolichoderus reflexus is a species of ant in the genus Dolichoderus. Described by John S. Clark in 1930, the species is endemic to Australia. Their nests can be found in soil, typically under rocks.
