= Dolichoderus omacanthus =

Scientific classification
- Domain: Eukaryota
- Kingdom: Animalia
- Phylum: Arthropoda
- Class: Insecta
- Order: Hymenoptera
- Family: Formicidae
- Subfamily: Dolichoderinae
- Genus: Dolichoderus
- Species: D. omacanthus

Binomial name
- Dolichoderus omacanthus (Kempf, 1972)

Species of ant

Dolichoderus omacanthus is a species of ant in the genus Dolichoderus. Described by Kempf in 1972, the species is endemic to Brazil.
