= Dolichoderus dentatus =

Scientific classification
- Kingdom: Animalia
- Phylum: Arthropoda
- Class: Insecta
- Order: Hymenoptera
- Family: Formicidae
- Subfamily: Dolichoderinae
- Genus: Dolichoderus
- Species: D. dentatus

Binomial name
- Dolichoderus dentatus Forel, 1902

Species of ant

Dolichoderus dentatus is a species of ant in the genus Dolichoderus. Described by Forel in 1902, the species is found in dry sclerophyll areas in eastern Queensland.
