= Dolichoderus australis =

Scientific classification
- Kingdom: Animalia
- Phylum: Arthropoda
- Class: Insecta
- Order: Hymenoptera
- Family: Formicidae
- Subfamily: Dolichoderinae
- Genus: Dolichoderus
- Species: D. australis

Binomial name
- Dolichoderus australis André, 1896

Species of ant

Dolichoderus australis is a species of ant in the genus Dolichoderus. Described by André in 1896, the species is endemic to Australia, where it is commonly found in wet forested areas in the southern regions of the country. It is particularly known for its unique behaviour and role in ecology.

== Description ==
Dolichoderus australis ants are small to medium-sized, measuring about 3-5 mm in length. They exhibit a distinctive shiny appearance with a dark brown to black coloration. The species has a characteristic node on the petiole and an elongated abdomen.

== Habitat ==
Dolichoderus australis is commonly found in diverse habitats including woodlands, forests, and urban areas. They prefer nesting under rocks, in soil, or within decaying wood. The species is adaptable to a range of environmental conditions.

== Behaviour and Ecology ==
Dolichoderus australis is known for its foraging behavior, often forming trails to food sources. The ants feed on a variety of substances including honeydew from aphids and other small insects. They play a significant role in the ecosystem by aiding in soil aeration and seed dispersal.

== Reproduction ==
Reproduction in Dolichoderus australis involves the production of winged reproductive males and females, which engage in nuptial flights. Following mating, queens establish new colonies, often starting with a small number of workers.

== Distribution ==
Dolichoderus australis is distributed widely across Australia. It is commonly observed in both natural and disturbed environments, indicating its high level of ecological adaptability.
