= Dolichoderus brevithorax =

Scientific classification
- Domain: Eukaryota
- Kingdom: Animalia
- Phylum: Arthropoda
- Class: Insecta
- Order: Hymenoptera
- Family: Formicidae
- Subfamily: Dolichoderinae
- Genus: Dolichoderus
- Species: D. brevithorax

Binomial name
- Dolichoderus brevithorax Menozzi, 1928

Species of ant

Dolichoderus brevithorax is a species of ant in the genus Dolichoderus. Described by Menozzi in 1928, the species is only endemic to Indonesia.
