= Dolichoderus prolaminatus =

†Dolichoderus prolaminatus Temporal range: Early Miocene Dominican amber

Scientific classification
- Domain: Eukaryota
- Kingdom: Animalia
- Phylum: Arthropoda
- Class: Insecta
- Order: Hymenoptera
- Family: Formicidae
- Subfamily: Dolichoderinae
- Genus: Dolichoderus
- Species: D. prolaminatus

Binomial name
- Dolichoderus prolaminatus (Wilson, 1985)

Species of ant

Dolichoderus prolaminatus is an extinct species of Miocene ant in the genus Dolichoderus. The fossils were found in the Dominican Amber, and was described by Wilson in 1985.
