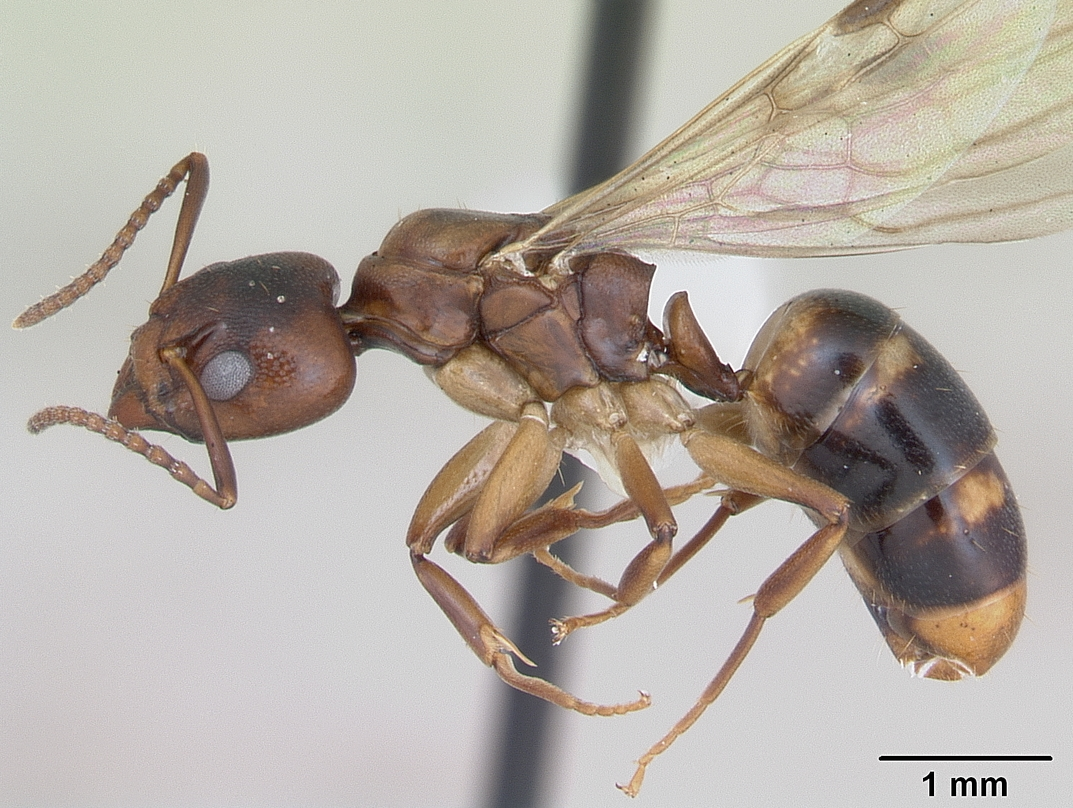

Scientific classification
- Kingdom: Animalia
- Phylum: Arthropoda
- Class: Insecta
- Order: Hymenoptera
- Family: Formicidae
- Subfamily: Dolichoderinae
- Genus: Dolichoderus
- Species: D. lutosus

Binomial name
- Dolichoderus lutosus (Smith, F., 1858)

Synonyms
- Dolichoderus lutosus nigriventris Forel, 1893; Hypoclinea cingulata Mayr, 1862

= Dolichoderus lutosus =

Species of ant

Dolichoderus lutosus is a species of ant in the genus Dolichoderus. Described by Smith in 1858, the species is endemic to both North and South America.
