= Dolichoderus angusticornis =

Scientific classification
- Kingdom: Animalia
- Phylum: Arthropoda
- Clade: Pancrustacea
- Class: Insecta
- Order: Hymenoptera
- Family: Formicidae
- Subfamily: Dolichoderinae
- Genus: Dolichoderus
- Species: D. angusticornis

Binomial name
- Dolichoderus angusticornis Clark, 1930

Species of ant

Dolichoderus angusticornis is a species of ant first described by John S. Clark in 1930. It is endemic to Australia,where it is found in dry scrub heath in Western Australia and South Australia. Workers are diurnal and forage during the day and at night.
