= Dolichoderus evolans =

†Dolichoderus evolans Temporal range: Miocene

Scientific classification
- Domain: Eukaryota
- Kingdom: Animalia
- Phylum: Arthropoda
- Class: Insecta
- Order: Hymenoptera
- Family: Formicidae
- Subfamily: Dolichoderinae
- Genus: Dolichoderus
- Species: D. evolans

Binomial name
- Dolichoderus evolans Zhang, 1989

Species of ant

Dolichoderus evolans is an extinct species of Miocene ant in the genus Dolichoderus. Described by Zhang in 1989, the fossilised species was discovered in China, where a possible queen has been described.
