= Dolichoderus caribbaeus =

†Dolichoderus caribbaeus Temporal range: Early Miocene Dominican amber

Scientific classification
- Domain: Eukaryota
- Kingdom: Animalia
- Phylum: Arthropoda
- Class: Insecta
- Order: Hymenoptera
- Family: Formicidae
- Subfamily: Dolichoderinae
- Genus: Dolichoderus
- Species: D. caribbaeus

Binomial name
- Dolichoderus caribbaeus (Wilson, 1985)

Species of ant

Dolichoderus caribbaeus is an extinct species of ant in the genus Dolichoderus. Remains were found in the Dominican Amber, and they were described by Wilson in 1985.
