= Dolichoderus burmanicus =

Scientific classification
- Domain: Eukaryota
- Kingdom: Animalia
- Phylum: Arthropoda
- Class: Insecta
- Order: Hymenoptera
- Family: Formicidae
- Subfamily: Dolichoderinae
- Genus: Dolichoderus
- Species: D. burmanicus

Binomial name
- Dolichoderus burmanicus Bingham, 1903

Species of ant

Dolichoderus burmanicus is a species of ant in the genus of Dolichoderus. Described by Charles Thomas Bingham in 1903, the species is endemic to the largest southeast Asian country of Myanmar.
