= Dolichoderus parvus =

Scientific classification
- Kingdom: Animalia
- Phylum: Arthropoda
- Class: Insecta
- Order: Hymenoptera
- Family: Formicidae
- Subfamily: Dolichoderinae
- Genus: Dolichoderus
- Species: D. parvus

Binomial name
- Dolichoderus parvus Clark, 1930

Synonyms
- Dolichoderus glauerti Wheeler, W.M., 1934

Species of ant

Dolichoderus parvus is a species of ant in the genus Dolichoderus. Described by John S. Clark in 1930, the species is endemic to Australia, found in dry sclerophyll habitats.
