= Dolichoderus spurius =

Scientific classification
- Domain: Eukaryota
- Kingdom: Animalia
- Phylum: Arthropoda
- Class: Insecta
- Order: Hymenoptera
- Family: Formicidae
- Subfamily: Dolichoderinae
- Genus: Dolichoderus
- Species: D. spurius

Binomial name
- Dolichoderus spurius Forel, 1903

Synonyms
- Dolichoderus bidens albatus Viehmeyer, 1922

Species of ant

Dolichoderus spurius is a species of ant in the genus Dolichoderus. Described by Auguste-Henri Forel in 1903, the species is endemic to South America.
