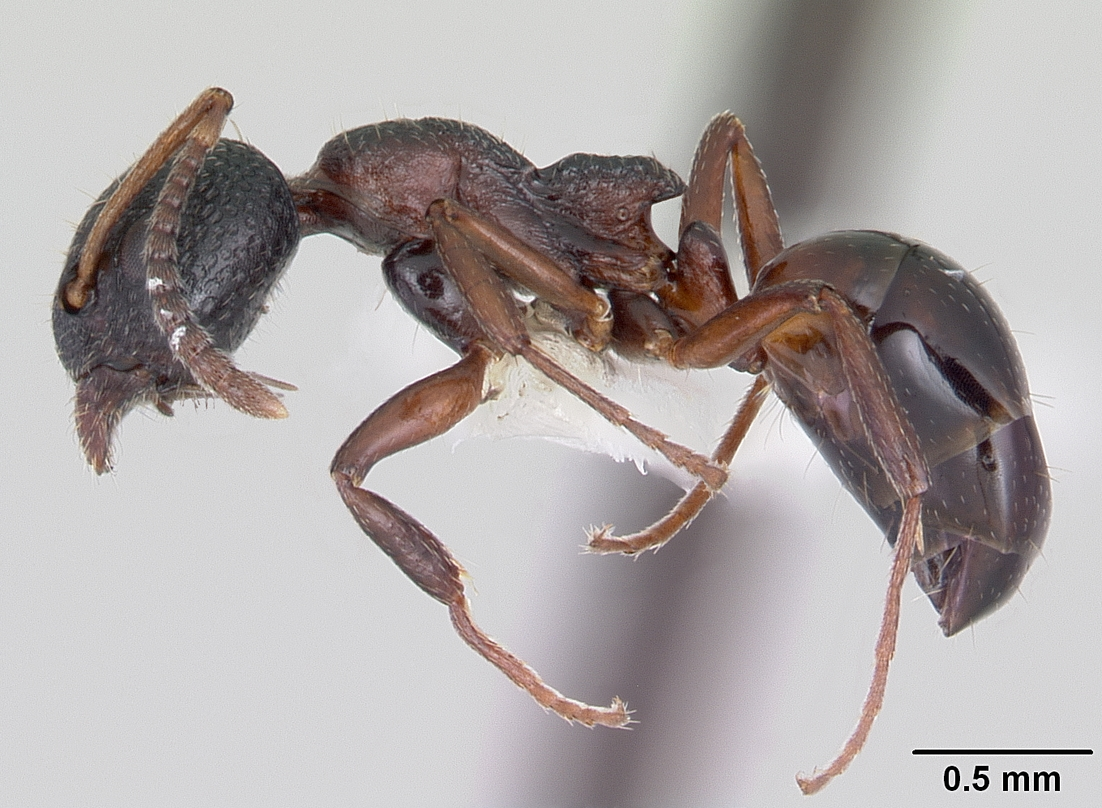
- Dolichoderus plagiatus specimen

Scientific classification
- Domain: Eukaryota
- Kingdom: Animalia
- Phylum: Arthropoda
- Class: Insecta
- Order: Hymenoptera
- Family: Formicidae
- Subfamily: Dolichoderinae
- Genus: Dolichoderus
- Species: D. plagiatus

Binomial name
- Dolichoderus plagiatus (Mayr, 1870)

Synonyms
- Dolichoderus borealis Provancher, 1888; Dolichoderus plagiatus inornatus Wheeler, W.M., 1905

= Dolichoderus plagiatus =

Species of ant

Dolichoderus plagiatus is a species of ant in the genus Dolichoderus. It was described by Mayr in 1870.

== Distribution ==
The species is endemic to North America. In can be found within the borders of Canada, Mexico and the United States. In Canada, they are found in New Brunswick, Ontario and Manitoba. In the United States, it can be found in North Dakota, and it is also commonly found in North Carolina, South Carolina and Georgia.
