= Dolichoderus niger =

Scientific classification
- Kingdom: Animalia
- Phylum: Arthropoda
- Class: Insecta
- Order: Hymenoptera
- Family: Formicidae
- Subfamily: Dolichoderinae
- Genus: Dolichoderus
- Species: D. niger

Binomial name
- Dolichoderus niger Crawley, 1922

Species of ant

Dolichoderus niger is a species of ant in the genus Dolichoderus. Described by Crawley in 1922, the species is endemic to Australia, and can be seen in scrub like habitats in Western Australia, and has been observed in native woodland around the city of Perth.
