= Dolichoderus omicron =

Scientific classification
- Kingdom: Animalia
- Phylum: Arthropoda
- Class: Insecta
- Order: Hymenoptera
- Family: Formicidae
- Subfamily: Dolichoderinae
- Genus: Dolichoderus
- Species: D. omicron

Binomial name
- Dolichoderus omicron Shattuck & Marsden, 2013

Species of ant

Dolichoderus omicron is a species of ant in the genus Dolichoderus. Described by Shattuck and Marsden in 2013, the species is endemic to Australia, being found in sem-arid regions and can be seen foraging during the day in columns on the ground surface. Colonies of this species can be found under rocks in soil.
