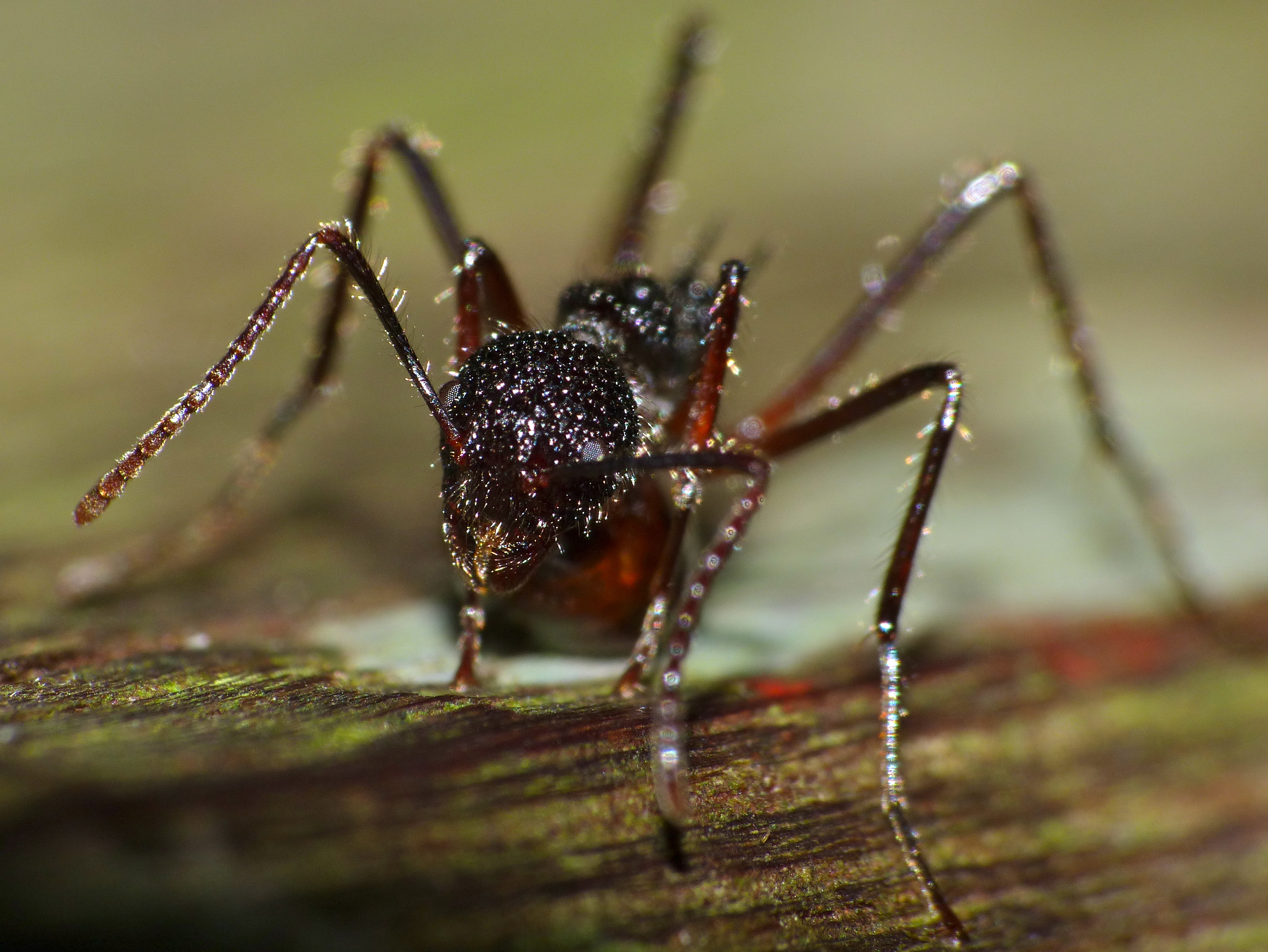

Scientific classification
- Domain: Eukaryota
- Kingdom: Animalia
- Phylum: Arthropoda
- Class: Insecta
- Order: Hymenoptera
- Family: Formicidae
- Subfamily: Dolichoderinae
- Genus: Dolichoderus
- Species: D. beccarii

Binomial name
- Dolichoderus beccarii Emery, 1887

= Dolichoderus beccarii =

Species of ant

Dolichoderus beccarii is a species of ant in the genus Dolichoderus. Described by Emery in 1887, the species is endemic to Borneo and Indonesia.
