= Dolichoderus polonicus =

†Dolichoderus polonicus Temporal range: Middle to Late Eocene Baltic amber

Scientific classification
- Domain: Eukaryota
- Kingdom: Animalia
- Phylum: Arthropoda
- Class: Insecta
- Order: Hymenoptera
- Family: Formicidae
- Subfamily: Dolichoderinae
- Genus: Dolichoderus
- Species: D. polonicus

Binomial name
- Dolichoderus polonicus Dlussky, 2002

Species of ant

Dolichoderus polonicus is an extinct species of Eocene ant in the genus Dolichoderus. Described by Dlussky in 2002, a fossilised worker was discovered in the Baltic amber.
