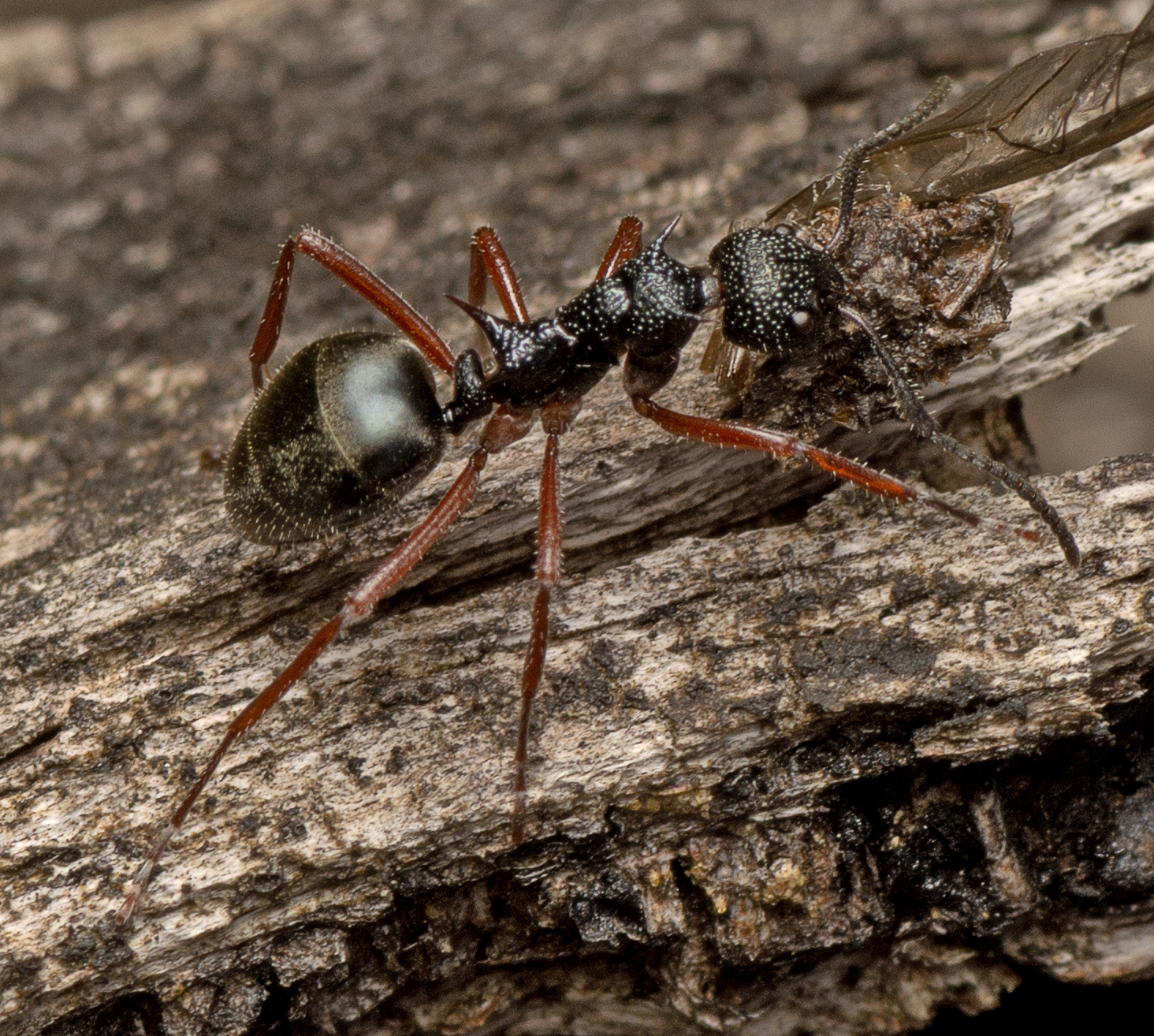
- Dolly Ant (Dolichoderus doriae) in Australia

Scientific classification
- Kingdom: Animalia
- Phylum: Arthropoda
- Class: Insecta
- Order: Hymenoptera
- Family: Formicidae
- Subfamily: Dolichoderinae
- Genus: Dolichoderus
- Species: D. doriae

Binomial name
- Dolichoderus doriae Emery, 1887

= Dolichoderus doriae =

Species of ant

Dolichoderus doriae is a species of ant in the genus Dolichoderus. It was described by Emery in 1887.

== Distribution and habitat ==
Colonies occur in areas with heavy forests and will inhabit both wet and dry sclerophyll in New South Wales, the Australian Capital Territory and Victoria.

Nests are commonly under soil or around the edges of stones and branches that appear on ground level, or in some cases will nest in rotten wood at bases of trees, and during warm weather workers and their brood will form balls on ground surfaces, and will forage in trails on the ground or on trees.
