= Dolichoderus schulzi =

Scientific classification
- Domain: Eukaryota
- Kingdom: Animalia
- Phylum: Arthropoda
- Class: Insecta
- Order: Hymenoptera
- Family: Formicidae
- Subfamily: Dolichoderinae
- Genus: Dolichoderus
- Species: D. schulzi

Binomial name
- Dolichoderus schulzi Emery, 1894

Synonyms
- Dolichoderus biolleyi Forel, 1908; Dolichoderus schulzi columbica Forel, 1914

Species of ant

Dolichoderus schulzi is a species of ant in the genus Dolichoderus. Described by Emery in 1894, the species is endemic to South America.
