= Dolichoderus modiglianii =

Scientific classification
- Domain: Eukaryota
- Kingdom: Animalia
- Phylum: Arthropoda
- Class: Insecta
- Order: Hymenoptera
- Family: Formicidae
- Subfamily: Dolichoderinae
- Genus: Dolichoderus
- Species: D. modiglianii

Binomial name
- Dolichoderus modiglianii Emery, 1900

Synonyms
- Dolichoderus modiglianii rubescens Emery, 1900

Species of ant

Dolichoderus modiglianii is a species of ant in the genus Dolichoderus. Described by Carlo Emery in 1900, the species is endemic to Indonesia.
