= Dolichoderus setosus =

Scientific classification
- Domain: Eukaryota
- Kingdom: Animalia
- Phylum: Arthropoda
- Class: Insecta
- Order: Hymenoptera
- Family: Formicidae
- Subfamily: Dolichoderinae
- Genus: Dolichoderus
- Species: D. setosus

Binomial name
- Dolichoderus setosus (Kempf, 1959)

Species of ant

Dolichoderus setosus is a species of ant in the genus Dolichoderus. Described by Kempf in 1959, the species is endemic to Brazil.
