= Dolichoderus brevicornis =

†Dolichoderus brevicornis Temporal range: Middle to Late Eocene Baltic amber

Scientific classification
- Domain: Eukaryota
- Kingdom: Animalia
- Phylum: Arthropoda
- Class: Insecta
- Order: Hymenoptera
- Family: Formicidae
- Subfamily: Dolichoderinae
- Genus: Dolichoderus
- Species: D. brevicornis

Binomial name
- Dolichoderus brevicornis Dlussky, 2002

Species of ant

Dolichoderus brevicornis is a species of ant in the genus Dolichoderus. Described by Dlussky in 2002, remains of the species were discovered in the Baltic Amber.
