= Dolichoderus canopus =

Scientific classification
- Kingdom: Animalia
- Phylum: Arthropoda
- Class: Insecta
- Order: Hymenoptera
- Family: Formicidae
- Subfamily: Dolichoderinae
- Genus: Dolichoderus
- Species: D. canopus

Binomial name
- Dolichoderus canopus Shattuck & Marsden, 2013

Species of ant

Dolichoderus canopus is a species of ant in the genus Dolichoderus. Described by Shattuck and Marsden in 2013, only two specimens of this species have been collected, which were taken from South Australia.
