= Dolichoderus turneri =

Scientific classification
- Kingdom: Animalia
- Phylum: Arthropoda
- Class: Insecta
- Order: Hymenoptera
- Family: Formicidae
- Subfamily: Dolichoderinae
- Genus: Dolichoderus
- Species: D. turneri

Binomial name
- Dolichoderus turneri Forel, 1902

Species of ant

Dolichoderus turneri is a species of ant in the genus Dolichoderus. Described by Auguste-Henri Forel in 1902, the species is endemic to Australia.
