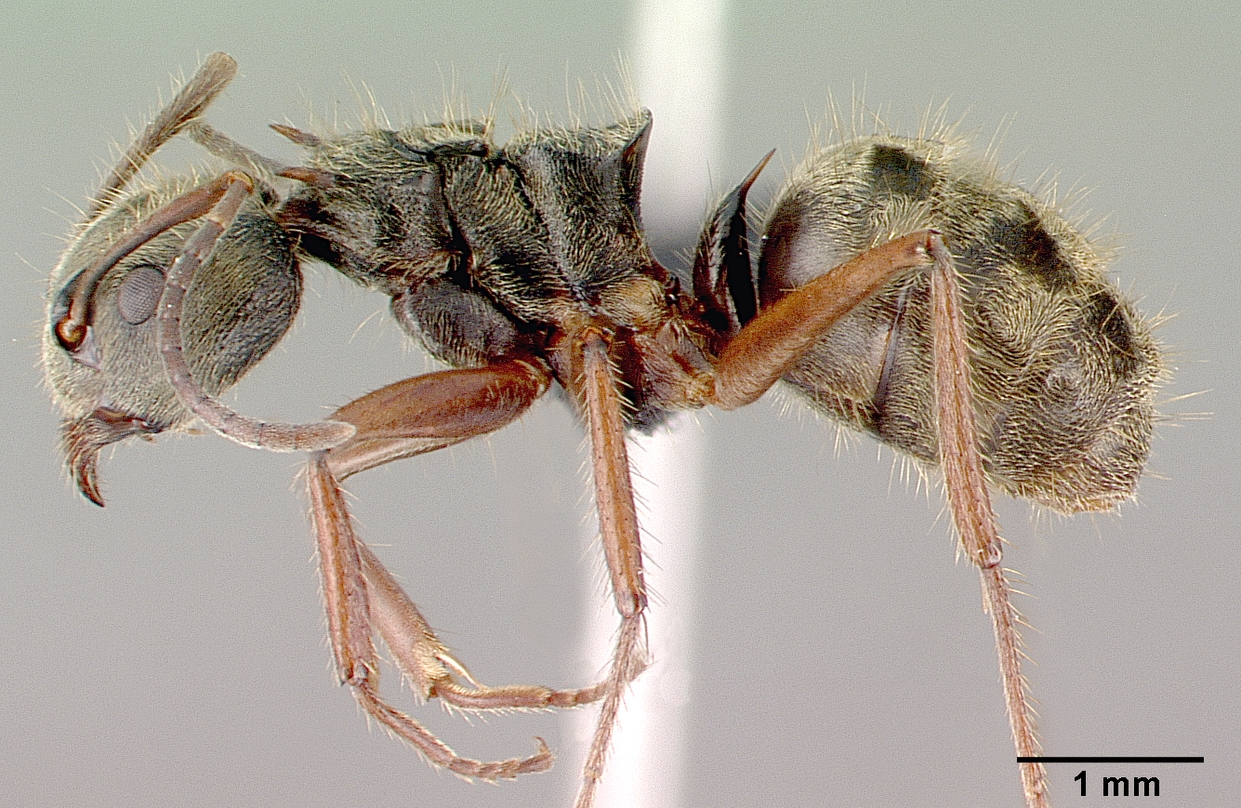

Scientific classification
- Domain: Eukaryota
- Kingdom: Animalia
- Phylum: Arthropoda
- Class: Insecta
- Order: Hymenoptera
- Family: Formicidae
- Subfamily: Dolichoderinae
- Genus: Dolichoderus
- Species: D. validus

Binomial name
- Dolichoderus validus (Kempf, 1959)

= Dolichoderus validus =

Species of ant

Dolichoderus validus is a species of ant in the genus Dolichoderus. Described by Kempf in 1959, the species is endemic to North America and South America.
