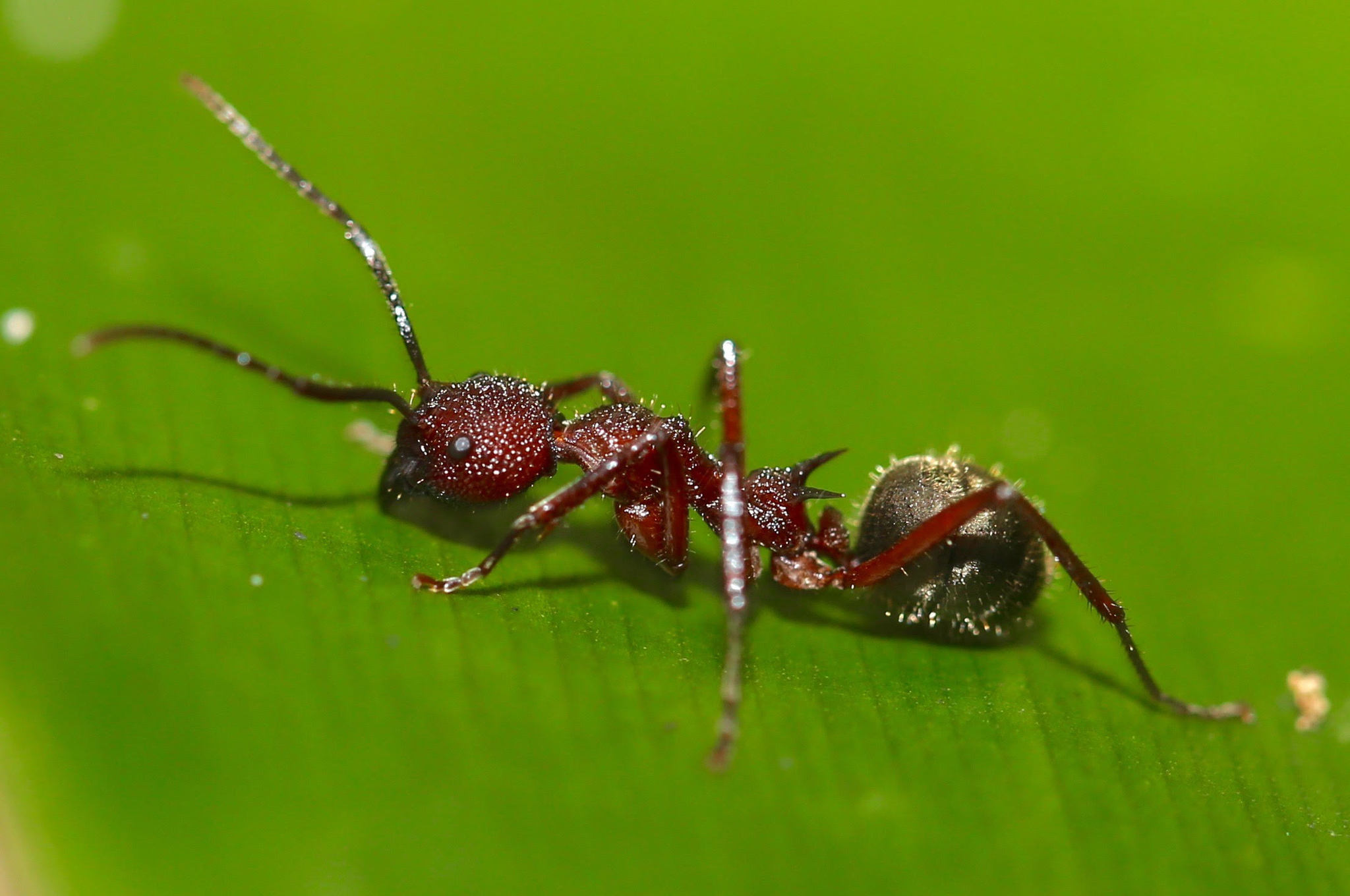

Scientific classification
- Domain: Eukaryota
- Kingdom: Animalia
- Phylum: Arthropoda
- Class: Insecta
- Order: Hymenoptera
- Family: Formicidae
- Subfamily: Dolichoderinae
- Genus: Dolichoderus
- Species: D. decollatus

Binomial name
- Dolichoderus decollatus Smith, F., 1858

Synonyms
- Dolichoderus capitatus Santschi, 1921

= Dolichoderus decollatus =

Species of ant

Dolichoderus decollatus is a species of ant in the subfamily Dolichoderinae. Described by Smith in 1858, the species is found in many countries of South America, including Bolivia, Brazil, Colombia, Ecuador, French Guiana, Guyana, Peru, Suriname and Trinidad and Tobago.
