= Dolichoderus kutschlinicus =

†Dolichoderus kutschlinicus Temporal range: Fossil

Scientific classification
- Domain: Eukaryota
- Kingdom: Animalia
- Phylum: Arthropoda
- Class: Insecta
- Order: Hymenoptera
- Family: Formicidae
- Subfamily: Dolichoderinae
- Genus: Dolichoderus
- Species: D. kutschlinicus

Binomial name
- Dolichoderus kutschlinicus (Deichmüller, 1881)

Species of ant

Dolichoderus kutschlinicus is an extinct species of ant within the genus Dolichoderus. It was described by Deichmüller in 1881, and fossils of a queen were unearthed in what was formerly Czechoslovakia.
