= Dolichoderus ferrugineus =

Scientific classification
- Domain: Eukaryota
- Kingdom: Animalia
- Phylum: Arthropoda
- Class: Insecta
- Order: Hymenoptera
- Family: Formicidae
- Subfamily: Dolichoderinae
- Genus: Dolichoderus
- Species: D. ferrugineus

Binomial name
- Dolichoderus ferrugineus Forel, 1903

Synonyms
- Dolichoderus bidens inferior Mann, 1916

Species of ant

Dolichoderus ferrugineus is a species of ant in the genus Dolichoderus. Described by Auguste-Henri Forel in 1903, the species is endemic to Bolivia and Brazil.
