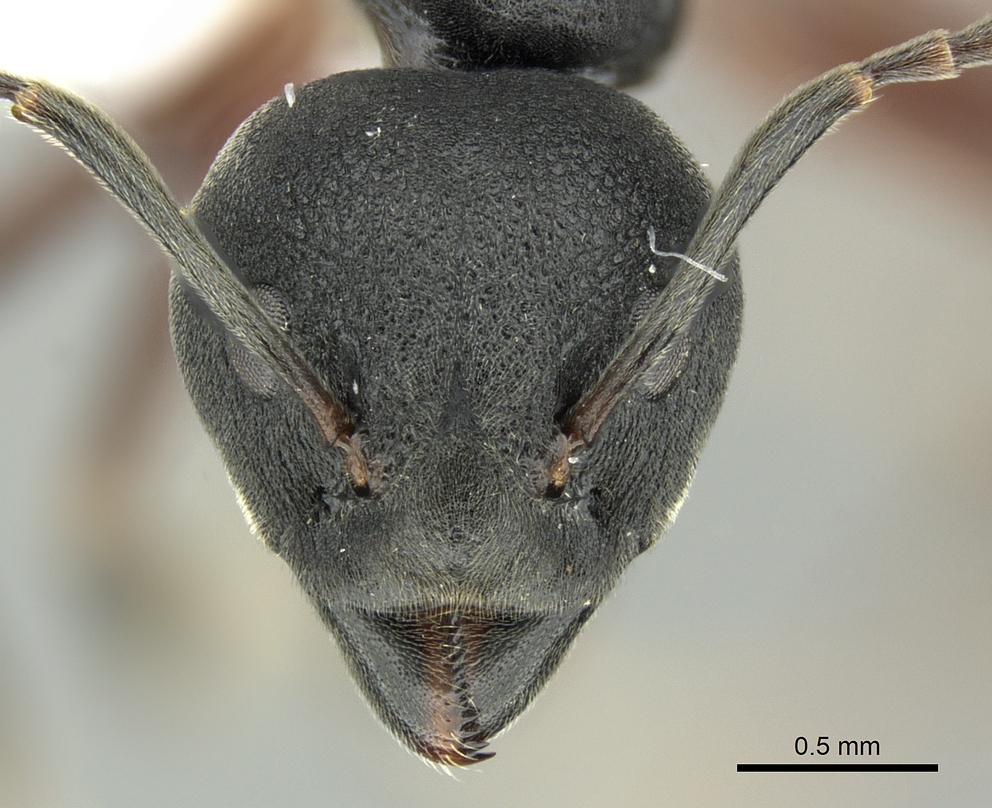

Scientific classification
- Domain: Eukaryota
- Kingdom: Animalia
- Phylum: Arthropoda
- Class: Insecta
- Order: Hymenoptera
- Family: Formicidae
- Subfamily: Dolichoderinae
- Genus: Dolichoderus
- Species: D. kinabaluensis

Binomial name
- Dolichoderus kinabaluensis Dill, 2002

= Dolichoderus kinabaluensis =

Species of ant

Dolichoderus kinabaluensis is a species of ant in the genus Dolichoderus. Described by Dill in 2002, the species is endemic to Borneo.
