= Dolichoderus lucidus =

†Dolichoneelus lucidus Temporal range: Eocene Rovno amber

Scientific classification
- Domain: Eukaryota
- Kingdom: Animalia
- Phylum: Arthropoda
- Class: Insecta
- Order: Hymenoptera
- Family: Formicidae
- Subfamily: Dolichoderinae
- Genus: Dolichoderus
- Species: D. lucidus

Binomial name
- Dolichoderus lucidus Dlussky, 2008

Species of ant

Dolichoderus lucidus is an extinct species of Eocene ant in the genus Dolichoderus. Described by Dlussky in 2008, the fossils of the species were found in the Rovno amber in Ukraine.
