= Dolichoderus curvilobus =

Scientific classification
- Domain: Eukaryota
- Kingdom: Animalia
- Phylum: Arthropoda
- Class: Insecta
- Order: Hymenoptera
- Family: Formicidae
- Subfamily: Dolichoderinae
- Genus: Dolichoderus
- Species: D. curvilobus

Binomial name
- Dolichoderus curvilobus (Lattke, 1987)

Species of ant

Dolichoderus curvilobus is a species of ant in the genus Dolichoderus. Described by Lattke in 1987, the species is endemic to Colombia and Costa Rica.
