= Dolichoderus inferus =

Scientific classification
- Kingdom: Animalia
- Phylum: Arthropoda
- Clade: Pancrustacea
- Class: Insecta
- Order: Hymenoptera
- Family: Formicidae
- Subfamily: Dolichoderinae
- Genus: Dolichoderus
- Species: D. inferus

Binomial name
- Dolichoderus inferus Shattuck & Marsden, 2013

Species of ant

Dolichoderus inferus is a species of ant in the genus Dolichoderus. Described by Shattuck and Marsden in 2013, the species is endemic to Australia, where it inhabits both wet and dry sclerophyll habitats and forages on low vegetation and trees.
