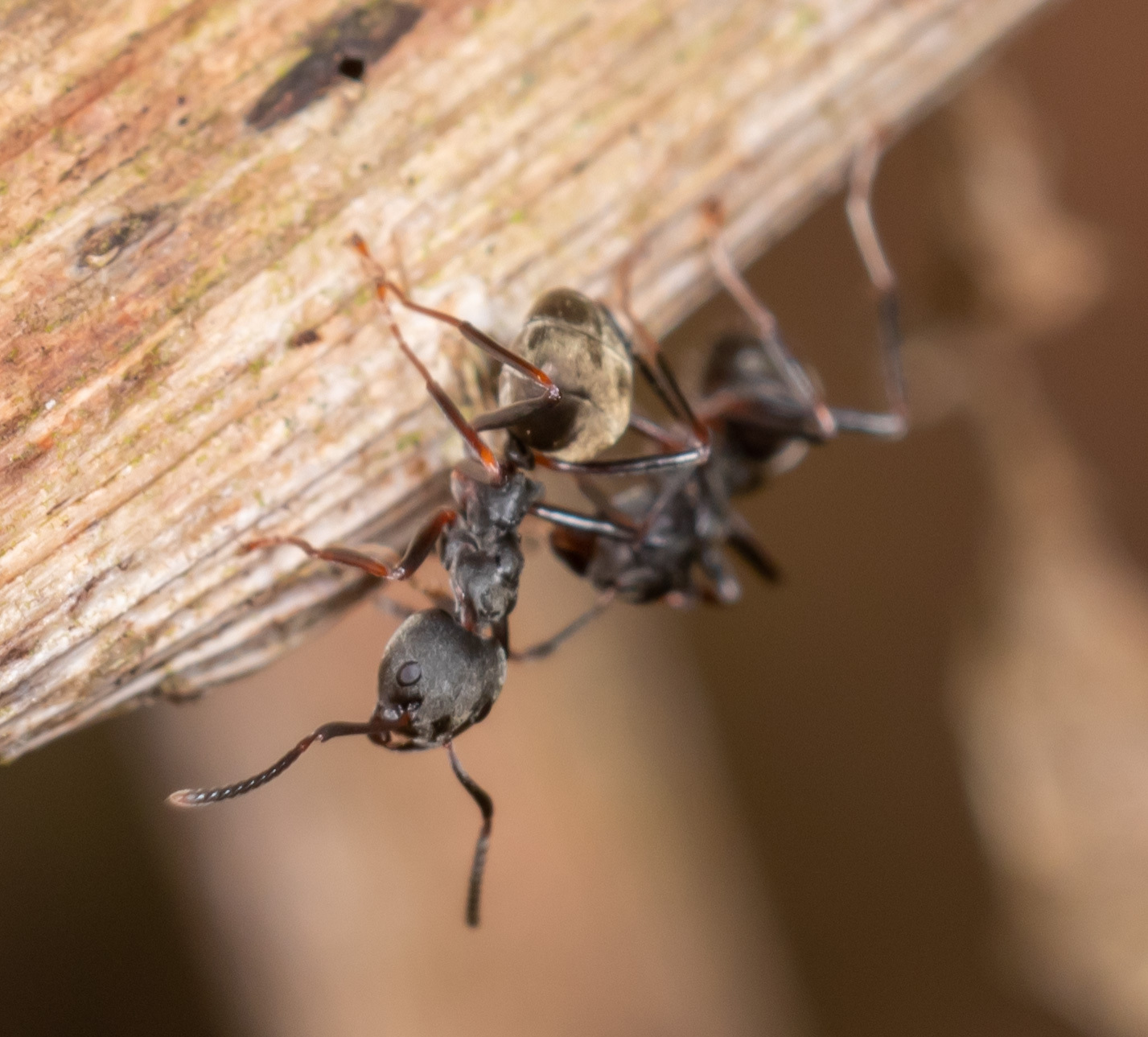
- D. laotius from Lom Sak, Thailand

Scientific classification
- Kingdom: Animalia
- Phylum: Arthropoda
- Class: Insecta
- Order: Hymenoptera
- Family: Formicidae
- Subfamily: Dolichoderinae
- Genus: Dolichoderus
- Species: D. laotius

Binomial name
- Dolichoderus laotius Santschi, 1920

= Dolichoderus laotius =

Species of ant

Dolichoderus laotius is a species of ant in the genus Dolichoderus. Described by Felix Santschi in 1920, the species is endemic to Laos.
