= Dolichoderus quadridenticulatus =

Scientific classification
- Domain: Eukaryota
- Kingdom: Animalia
- Phylum: Arthropoda
- Class: Insecta
- Order: Hymenoptera
- Family: Formicidae
- Subfamily: Dolichoderinae
- Genus: Dolichoderus
- Species: D. quadridenticulatus

Binomial name
- Dolichoderus quadridenticulatus (Roger, 1862)

Synonyms
- Formica gibbosa, 1858; Dolichoderus analis Emery, 1894; Dolichoderus gibbosus gibbosoanalis Forel, 1922; Dolichoderus gibbosus integra Forel, 1911; Dolichoderus gibbosus nitidior Emery, 1894

Species of ant

Dolichoderus quadridenticulatus is a species of ant in the genus Dolichoderus. Described by Roger in 1862, the species is endemic to South America.
