= Dolichoderus lacinius =

†Dolichoderus lacinius Temporal range: Miocene

Scientific classification
- Domain: Eukaryota
- Kingdom: Animalia
- Phylum: Arthropoda
- Class: Insecta
- Order: Hymenoptera
- Family: Formicidae
- Subfamily: Dolichoderinae
- Genus: Dolichoderus
- Species: D. lacinius

Binomial name
- Dolichoderus lacinius Zhang, 1989

Species of ant

Dolichoderus lacinius is an extinct species of Miocene ant in the genus Dolichoderus. Described by Zhang in 1989, fossils of a queen specimen were found in China.
