= Dolichoderus incisus =

Scientific classification
- Domain: Eukaryota
- Kingdom: Animalia
- Phylum: Arthropoda
- Class: Insecta
- Order: Hymenoptera
- Family: Formicidae
- Subfamily: Dolichoderinae
- Genus: Dolichoderus
- Species: D. incisus

Binomial name
- Dolichoderus incisus Xu, 1995

Species of ant

Dolichoderus incisus is a species of ant in the genus Dolichoderus. Described by Xu in 1995, the species is endemic to China.
