= Dolichoderus gagates =

Scientific classification
- Kingdom: Animalia
- Phylum: Arthropoda
- Clade: Pancrustacea
- Class: Insecta
- Order: Hymenoptera
- Family: Formicidae
- Subfamily: Dolichoderinae
- Genus: Dolichoderus
- Species: D. gagates

Binomial name
- Dolichoderus gagates Emery, 1890

Species of ant

Dolichoderus gagates is a species of ant in the genus Dolichoderus. Described by Emery in 1890, the species is endemic to multiple countries, including Bolivia, Brazil, French Guiana, Guyana, Suriname and Venezuela.
