= Dolichoderus gordoni =

Scientific classification
- Kingdom: Animalia
- Phylum: Arthropoda
- Class: Insecta
- Order: Hymenoptera
- Family: Formicidae
- Subfamily: Dolichoderinae
- Genus: Dolichoderus
- Species: D. gordoni

Binomial name
- Dolichoderus gordoni Shattuck & Marsden, 2013

Species of ant

Dolichoderus gordoni is a species of ant in the genus Dolichoderus. Described by Shattuck and Marsden in 2013, the species is only known from southern Queensland in Australia, mainly around forested areas.
