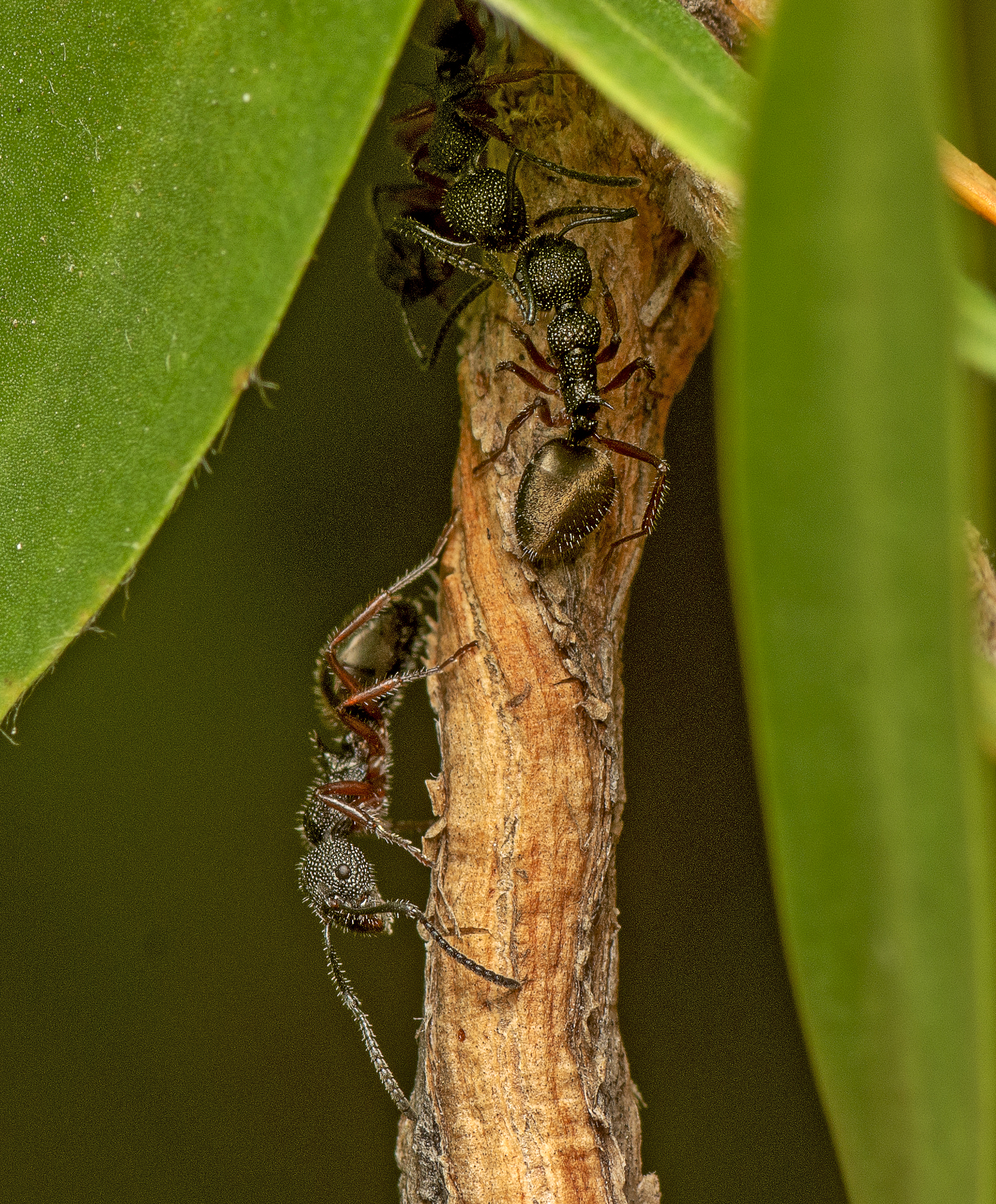

Scientific classification
- Kingdom: Animalia
- Phylum: Arthropoda
- Class: Insecta
- Order: Hymenoptera
- Family: Formicidae
- Subfamily: Dolichoderinae
- Genus: Dolichoderus
- Species: D. ypsilon

Binomial name
- Dolichoderus ypsilon Forel, 1902

= Dolichoderus ypsilon =

Species of ant

Dolichoderus ypsilon is a species of ant in the genus Dolichoderus. Described by Auguste-Henri Forel in 1902, the species is found in areas in Western Australia in Australia.
