= Dolichoderus mesonotalis =

Scientific classification
- Domain: Eukaryota
- Kingdom: Animalia
- Phylum: Arthropoda
- Class: Insecta
- Order: Hymenoptera
- Family: Formicidae
- Subfamily: Dolichoderinae
- Genus: Dolichoderus
- Species: D. mesonotalis

Binomial name
- Dolichoderus mesonotalis Forel, 1907

Synonyms
- Dolichoderus grandii Menozzi, 1924; Dolichoderus simplex Forel, 1912

Species of ant

Dolichoderus mesonotalis is a species of ant in the genus Dolichoderus. Described by Auguste-Henri Forel in 1907, the species is endemic to Brazil and Peru.
