= Dolichoderus tricolor =

Scientific classification
- Domain: Eukaryota
- Kingdom: Animalia
- Phylum: Arthropoda
- Class: Insecta
- Order: Hymenoptera
- Family: Formicidae
- Subfamily: Dolichoderinae
- Genus: Dolichoderus
- Species: D. tricolor

Binomial name
- Dolichoderus tricolor Emery, 1914

Species of ant

Dolichoderus tricolor is a species of ant in the genus Dolichoderus. Described by Emery in 1914, the species is endemic to New Caledonia.
