= Dolichoderus jiaoyanshanensis =

†Dolichoderus jiaoyanshanensis Temporal range: Early Miocene

Scientific classification
- Kingdom: Animalia
- Phylum: Arthropoda
- Clade: Pancrustacea
- Class: Insecta
- Order: Hymenoptera
- Family: Formicidae
- Subfamily: Dolichoderinae
- Genus: Dolichoderus
- Species: D. jiaoyanshanensis

Binomial name
- Dolichoderus jiaoyanshanensis (Hong, 1985)

Species of ant

Dolichoderus jiaoyanshanensis is an extinct species of ant in the genus Dolichoderus. Fossils containing the species were found in China, and it was described by Hong in 1985. The ant is from Shanwang and is presumed to be a Miocene insect.
