= Dolichoderus carbonarius =

Scientific classification
- Domain: Eukaryota
- Kingdom: Animalia
- Phylum: Arthropoda
- Class: Insecta
- Order: Hymenoptera
- Family: Formicidae
- Subfamily: Dolichoderinae
- Genus: Dolichoderus
- Species: D. carbonarius

Binomial name
- Dolichoderus carbonarius Emery, 1895

Subspecies
- Dolichoderus carbonarius latisquamis Emery, 1900

Species of ant

Dolichoderus carbonarius is a species of ant in the genus Dolichoderinae. Described by Emery in 1895, the species is only endemic to Malaysia.
