= Dolichoderus cuspidatus =

Scientific classification
- Domain: Eukaryota
- Kingdom: Animalia
- Phylum: Arthropoda
- Class: Insecta
- Order: Hymenoptera
- Family: Formicidae
- Subfamily: Dolichoderinae
- Genus: Dolichoderus
- Species: D. cuspidatus

Binomial name
- Dolichoderus cuspidatus (Smith, F., 1857)

Synonyms
- Dolichoderus atra Menozzi, 1930; Dolichoderus bifurcatus Karavaiev, 1926; Dolichoderus cuspidatus surbecki Santschi, 1925; Dolichoderus cuspidatus tenuispina Viehmeyer, 1922

Species of ant

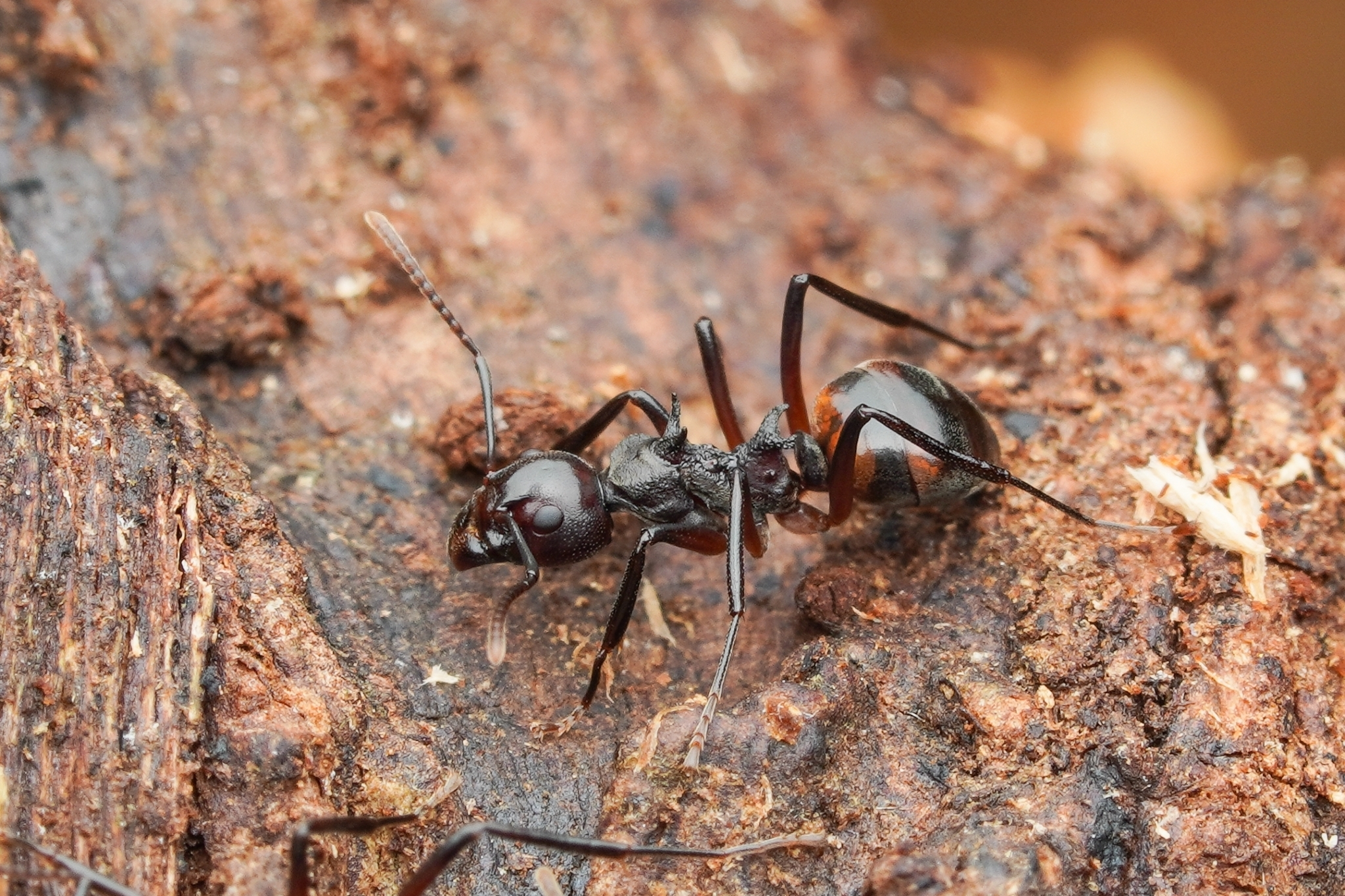
Picture of Dolichoderus cuspidatus ant

Dolichoderus cuspidatus is a species of ant in the genus Dolichoderus. Described by Smith in 1857, the species is endemic to Borneo, Indonesia, Malaysia and Thailand.
