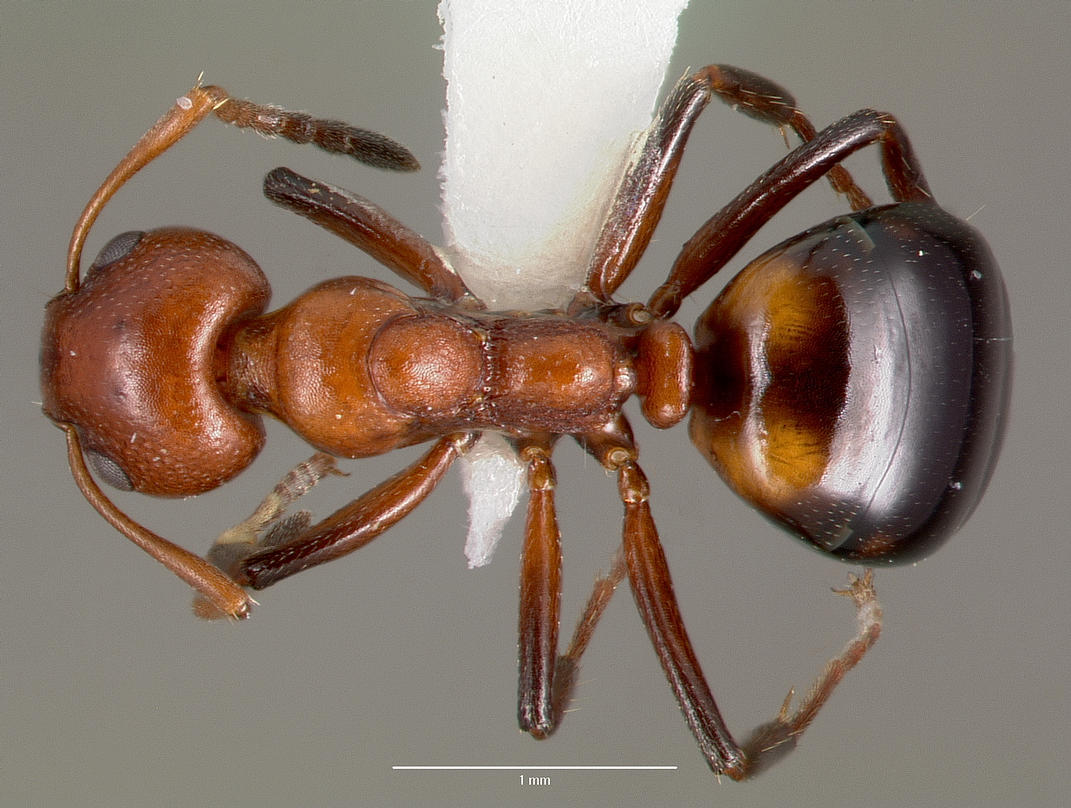
- Dolichoderus mariae

Scientific classification
- Kingdom: Animalia
- Phylum: Arthropoda
- Clade: Pancrustacea
- Class: Insecta
- Order: Hymenoptera
- Family: Formicidae
- Subfamily: Dolichoderinae
- Tribe: Dolichoderini; Forel, 1878
- Genus: Dolichoderus; Lund, 1831

Type species
- Formica attelaboides

Diversity
- 181 species

Synonyms
- Acanthoclinea Wheeler, 1935; Diceratoclinea Wheeler, 1935; Hypoclinea Mayr, 1855; Karawajewella Donisthorpe, 1944; Monacis Roger, 1862; Monoceratoclinea Wheeler, 1935

= Dolichoderus =

Dolichoderus Temporal range: Early Eocene – Recent

Genus of ants

Dolichoderus is a genus of dolichoderine ants found in eastern North America, Central America, tropical South America, Europe, most of Asia, and Australasia. The genus is the sole member of the tribe Dolichoderini and has an extensive fossil history across Baltic amber deposits in Europe. Dolichoderus is the type genus of the subfamily Dolichoderinae and was described in 1831. These ants cannot sting, are often seen tending to aphids and scale insects for honeydew, and some species of the genus, members of the D. cuspidatus group endemic to Southeast Asia, are nomadic aphid farmers.

== Taxonomy ==
The genus Dolichoderus has been historically treated in up to seven subgenera or genera. The ants of the former Neotropical genus Monacis were revised in 1959 by Kempf. However, Brown in 1973 and G. C. Wheeler and J. Wheeler in 1973 and 1976 considered both Monacis and Hypoclinea to be junior synonyms of Dolichoderus. Subsequently, the genera Hypoclinea, Monacis, and Monoceratoclinea were revived by Hölldobler and Wilson. Most recently, Shattuck again synonymized all previous genera and subgenera under the single name Dolichoderus, which remains the current valid circumscription.

== Description ==
The type species is Dolichoderus attelaboides (Fabricius, 1775). Worker ants in this genus have a body length that is typically about four millimetres and can be recognised by their thick, inflexible and strongly sculptured integument. There is a flange on the underside of the head near the base of the mandibles which is tooth-like in some species. The longitudinal suture in the central plate of the metathorax is deeply impressed. The propodeum or first abdominal segment has the posterior face distinctly concave when viewed from the side. The gaster and mesosoma are separated by a single segment, the petiole. The orifice of the cloaca is a horizontal slit rather than a circular opening. It may be surrounded by a few rather stiff erect bristles.

== Distribution ==
Members of this genus are found worldwide, except for the continent of Africa; North America west of the Rocky Mountains, and the Southern Cone of Australia.

== Biology ==
Colonies are of varying sizes and are constructed in the soil, in curled leaves, in the hollow stems of plants and in cartons which are formed by the ants chewing wood and mixing the product with secretions in a similar way to that used by wasps to build their nests. Some species are very versatile, with Dolichoderus pustulatus nesting underground in northern parts of the United States while living wholly in trees in the south. The workers seek out and tend sap-sucking insects such as aphids and scale insects that excrete honeydew and they also feed on small arthropods. Members of the Dolichoderus cuspidatus species group are unique among ants in being nomadic herbivores (i.e., not building permanent nests) which are obligate mutualists with coevolved pseudococcid mealybugs. Some species emit a pungent smelling fluid like other members of the subfamily. Several species are polygynous with several queens in one nest. It is also possible that D. taschenbergi may be a temporary social parasite with D. plagiatus as host.

== Species ==
As of 2026, the genus contains 181 valid species, including 131 extant and 50 extinct.

=== Extant ===
- Dolichoderus abruptus (Smith, 1858)
- Dolichoderus affinis Emery, 1889
- Dolichoderus albamaculus Shattuck & Marsden, 2013
- Dolichoderus andinus (Kempf, 1962)
- Dolichoderus angusticornis Clark, 1930
- Dolichoderus attelaboides (Fabricius, 1775)
- Dolichoderus australis André, 1896
- Dolichoderus baenae MacKay, 1993
- Dolichoderus bakhtiari Barabag & Jaitrong, 2022
- Dolichoderus beccarii Emery, 1887
- Dolichoderus bidens (Linnaeus, 1758)
- Dolichoderus bispinosus (Olivier, 1792)
- Dolichoderus brevis Santschi, 1920
- Dolichoderus brevithorax Menozzi, 1928
- Dolichoderus burmanicus Bingham, 1903
- Dolichoderus butteli Forel, 1913
- Dolichoderus canopus Shattuck & Marsden, 2013
- Dolichoderus carbonarius Emery, 1895
- Dolichoderus clarki Wheeler, 1935
- Dolichoderus clusor Forel, 1907
- Dolichoderus cogitans Forel, 1912
- Dolichoderus coniger (Mayr, 1870)
- Dolichoderus crawleyi Donisthorpe, 1917
- Dolichoderus curvilobus (Lattke, 1987)
- Dolichoderus cuspidatus (Smith, 1857)
- Dolichoderus dajiensis Wang & Zheng, 2005
- Dolichoderus debilis Emery, 1890
- Dolichoderus decollatus Smith, 1858
- Dolichoderus dentatus Forel, 1902
- Dolichoderus diversus Emery, 1894
- Dolichoderus doloniger (Roger, 1862)
- Dolichoderus doriae Emery, 1887
- Dolichoderus epetreius (Lattke, 1987)
- Dolichoderus erectilobus Santschi, 1920
- Dolichoderus etus Shattuck & Marsden, 2013
- Dolichoderus extensispinus Forel, 1915
- Dolichoderus feae Emery, 1889
- Dolichoderus fernandezi MacKay, 1993
- Dolichoderus ferrugineus Forel, 1903
- Dolichoderus flatidorsus Zhou & Zheng, 1997
- Dolichoderus formosus Clark, 1930
- Dolichoderus furcifer Emery, 1887
- Dolichoderus gagates Emery, 1890
- Dolichoderus germaini Emery, 1894
- Dolichoderus ghilianii Emery, 1894
- Dolichoderus gibbifer Emery, 1887
- Dolichoderus gibbus (Smith, 1861)
- Dolichoderus gordoni Shattuck & Marsden, 2013
- Dolichoderus goudiei Clark, 1930
- Dolichoderus haradae MacKay, 1993
- Dolichoderus imitator Emery, 1894
- Dolichoderus incisus Xu, 1995
- Dolichoderus indrapurensis Forel, 1912
- Dolichoderus inermis MacKay, 1993
- Dolichoderus inferus Shattuck & Marsden, 2013
- Dolichoderus inpai (Harada, 1987)
- Dolichoderus jacobsoni Forel, 1909
- Dolichoderus kathae Shattuck & Marsden, 2013
- Dolichoderus kinabaluensis Dill, 2002
- Dolichoderus lactarius (Smith, 1860)
- Dolichoderus lamellosus (Mayr, 1870)
- Dolichoderus laminatus (Mayr, 1870)
- Dolichoderus laotius Santschi, 1920
- Dolichoderus laurae MacKay, 1993
- Dolichoderus lobicornis (Kempf, 1959)
- Dolichoderus longicollis MacKay, 1993
- Dolichoderus luederwaldti Santschi, 1921
- Dolichoderus lugens Emery, 1894
- Dolichoderus lujae Santschi, 1923
- Dolichoderus lutosus (Smith, 1858)
- Dolichoderus magnipastor Dill, 2002
- Dolichoderus mariae Forel, 1885
- Dolichoderus maschwitzi Dill, 2002
- Dolichoderus mesonotalis Forel, 1907
- Dolichoderus modiglianii Emery, 1900
- Dolichoderus moggridgei Forel, 1886
- Dolichoderus monoceros Emery, 1897
- Dolichoderus mucronifer (Roger, 1862)
- Dolichoderus niger Crawley, 1922
- Dolichoderus nigricornis Clark, 1930
- Dolichoderus omacanthus (Kempf, 1972)
- Dolichoderus omicron Shattuck & Marsden, 2013
- Dolichoderus parvus Clark, 1930
- Dolichoderus pastorulus Dill, 2002
- Dolichoderus patens (Mayr, 1870)
- Dolichoderus piceus MacKay, 1993
- Dolichoderus pilinomas Dill, 2002
- Dolichoderus pilosus Zhou & Zheng, 1997
- Dolichoderus plagiatus (Mayr, 1870)
- Dolichoderus pustulatus Mayr, 1886
- Dolichoderus quadridenticulatus (Roger, 1862)
- Dolichoderus quadripunctatus (Linnaeus, 1771)
- Dolichoderus reflexus Clark, 1930
- Dolichoderus rosenbergi Forel, 1911
- Dolichoderus rufescens Mann, 1912
- Dolichoderus rufotibialis Clark, 1930
- Dolichoderus rugocapitus Zhou, 2001
- Dolichoderus rugosus (Smith, 1858)
- Dolichoderus rutilus Shattuck & Marsden, 2013
- Dolichoderus sagmanotus Xu, 2001
- Dolichoderus satanus Bolton, 1995
- Dolichoderus scabridus Roger, 1862
- Dolichoderus schulzi Emery, 1894
- Dolichoderus scrobiculatus (Mayr, 1876)
- Dolichoderus semiorbis Shattuck & Marsden, 2013
- Dolichoderus semirugosus (Mayr, 1870)
- Dolichoderus septemspinosus Emery, 1894
- Dolichoderus setosus (Kempf, 1959)
- Dolichoderus shattucki MacKay, 1993
- Dolichoderus sibiricus Emery, 1889
- Dolichoderus siggii Forel, 1895
- Dolichoderus smithi MacKay, 1993
- Dolichoderus spinicollis (Latreille, 1817)
- Dolichoderus spurius Forel, 1903
- Dolichoderus squamanodus Xu, 2001
- Dolichoderus sulcaticeps (Mayr, 1870)
- Dolichoderus sundari Mathew & Tiwari, 2000
- Dolichoderus superaculus (Lattke, 1987)
- Dolichoderus taprobanae (Smith, 1858)
- Dolichoderus taschenbergi (Mayr, 1866)
- Dolichoderus thoracicus (Smith, 1860)
- Dolichoderus tricolor Emery, 1914
- Dolichoderus tricornis Emery, 1897
- Dolichoderus tristis Mann, 1916
- Dolichoderus tuberifer Emery, 1887
- Dolichoderus turneri Forel, 1902
- Dolichoderus utriensis Ortiz & Fernández, 2011
- Dolichoderus validus (Kempf, 1959)
- Dolichoderus varians Mann, 1916
- Dolichoderus voraginosus MacKay, 1993
- Dolichoderus ypsilon Forel, 1902

=== Extinct ===
- †Dolichoderus affectus Théobald, 1937
- †Dolichoderus antiquus Carpenter, 1930
- †Dolichoderus balticus (Mayr, 1868)
- †Dolichoderus brevicornis Dlussky, 2002
- †Dolichoderus brevipalpis Dlussky, 2008
- †Dolichoderus brevipennis Dlussky, 2008
- †Dolichoderus bruneti Théobald, 1937
- †Dolichoderus caribbaeus (Wilson, 1985)
- †Dolichoderus coquandi Théobald, 1937
- †Dolichoderus cornutus (Mayr, 1868)
- †Dolichoderus dibolius Wilson, 1985
- †Dolichoderus dlusskyi LaPolla & Greenwalt, 2015
- †Dolichoderus elegans Wheeler, 1915
- †Dolichoderus evolans Zhang, 1989
- †Dolichoderus explicans (Förster, 1891)
- †Dolichoderus granulinotus Dlussky, 2008
- †Dolichoderus heeri Dlussky & Putyatina, 2014
- †Dolichoderus intermedius MacKay, 1993
- †Dolichoderus jiaoyanshanensis (Hong, 1985)
- †Dolichoderus jonasi Dubovikoff & Zharkov, 2022
- †Dolichoderus kohlsi Dlussky & Rasnitsyn, 2003
- †Dolichoderus kutscheri Dlussky, 2008
- †Dolichoderus kutschlinicus (Deichmüller, 1881)
- †Dolichoderus lacinius Zhang, 1989
- †Dolichoderus longipennis (Mayr, 1868)
- †Dolichoderus longipilosus Dlussky, 2002
- †Dolichoderus lucidus Dlussky, 2008
- †Dolichoderus luridivenosus Zhang et al., 1994
- †Dolichoderus mesosternalis Wheeler, 1915
- †Dolichoderus nanus Dlussky, 2002
- †Dolichoderus obliteratus (Scudder, 1877)
- †Dolichoderus oviformis Théobald, 1937
- †Dolichoderus passalomma Wheeler, 1915
- †Dolichoderus perkovskyi Dlussky, 2008
- †Dolichoderus pilipes Dlussky, 2008
- †Dolichoderus pinguis Dlussky et al., 2015
- †Dolichoderus polessus Dlussky, 2002
- †Dolichoderus polonicus Dlussky, 2002
- †Dolichoderus primitivus (Wilson, 1985)
- †Dolichoderus prolaminatus (Wilson, 1985)
- †Dolichoderus punctatus Dlussky, 2008
- †Dolichoderus robustus Dlussky, 2002
- †Dolichoderus rohweri Carpenter, 1930
- †Dolichoderus sculpturatus (Mayr, 1868)
- †Dolichoderus tauricus Dlussky, 1981
- †Dolichoderus tertiarius (Mayr, 1868)
- †Dolichoderus transversipetiolaris Zhang et al., 1994
- †Dolichoderus vectensis Donisthorpe, 1920
- †Dolichoderus vlaskini Dlussky, 2008
- †Dolichoderus zherichini Dlussky & Perkovsky, 2002
