= 2021 in paleoichthyology =

This list of fossil fish research presented in 2021 is a list of new taxa of jawless vertebrates, placoderms, acanthodians, fossil cartilaginous fishes, bony fishes, and other fishes that were described during the year, as well as other significant discoveries and events related to paleoichthyology that occurred in 2021.

== Jawless vertebrates ==
Name	Novelty	Status	Authors	Age	Type locality	Location	Notes	Images
Falxcornus	Gen. et sp. nov	In press	Meng & Gai	Devonian (Lochkovian)	Xishancun Formation	China	A member of Galeaspida belonging to the family Tridensaspidae. Genus includes new species F. liui.	
Hongshanaspis	Gen. et sp. nov	Valid	Liu et al.	Silurian (Telychian)	Qingshui Formation	China	A member of Galeaspida belonging to the family Hanyangaspidae. Genus includes new species H. inexpectatus.	
Jiangxialepis	Gen. et sp. nov	Valid	Liu et al.	Silurian (Telychian)	Fentou Formation	China	A member of Galeaspida belonging to the group Eugaleaspidiformes. The type species is J. retrospina.	
Qushiaspis	Gen. et sp. nov	Valid	Jiang et al.	Early Devonian	Xujiachong Formation	China	A member of Galeaspida. Genus includes new species Q. elaia.	

=== Jawless fishes research ===
- A study on the phylogenetic relationships of cyathaspidids is published by Elliott, Lassiter & Blieck (2021).
- Miyashita et al. (2021) report larval and juvenile forms of four stem lampreys from the Paleozoic era (Hardistiella, Mayomyzon, Pipiscius and Priscomyzon), including a hatchling-to-adult growth series of Priscomyzon, and report that the studied larvae display features that are otherwise unique to adult modern lampreys, and lack the defining traits of ammocoetes.
- A study on the anatomy and likely feeding ecology of Mesomyzon mengae, based on data from new, well-preserved specimens, is published by Wu, Chang & Janvier (2021).
- A study on the histology of the dermal skeleton in Procephalaspis oeselensis, Aestiaspis viitaensis, Dartmuthia gemmifera and four species of Tremataspis is published by Bremer et al. (2021), who interpret their findings as indicative of the emergence of the complex pore-canal system in Tremataspis through the modification of the structures already present in other taxa.
- A study aiming to determine whether the earliest vertebrates may have swum under various conditions without a clearly-differentiated tail fin, based on data from an abstracted model of Metaspriggina walcotti, is published by Rival, Yang & Caron (2021).
- A study on the morphological and functional diversity of osteostracan and galeaspid headshields, and on its implications for the knowledge of the ecology of the immediate jawless relatives of jawed vertebrates, is published by Ferrón et al. (2021).
- Redescription of Nochelaspis maeandrine is published by Meng, Zhu & Gai (2021).
- A study on the anatomy of a dorsal head shield of Kalanaspis delectabilis is published by Tinn et al. (2021).

== Placoderms ==
Name	Novelty	Status	Authors	Age	Type locality	Country	Notes	Images
Bianchengichthys	Gen. et sp. nov	Valid	Li, Zhu & Zhu in Li et al.	Silurian (Ludfordian)	Xiaoxi Formation	China	A placoderm closely related to the last common ancestor of bony and cartilaginous fishes. The type species is B. micros.	
Leptodontichthys	Gen. et sp. nov		Jobbins et al.	Devonian (Givetian)	Taboumakhlouf Formation	Morocco	A member of Arthrodira belonging to the family Plourdosteidae. The type species is L. ziregensis.	

=== Placoderm research ===
- Zhu et al. (2021) use CT scanning to reveal the endocast of Brindabellaspis stensioi, and evaluate the implications of its anatomy for the knowledge of the phylogenetic relationships of early jawed vertebrates.
- Redescription of the anatomy of the headshield of Parayunnanolepis xitunensis is published by Wang & Zhu (2021).
- Description of new fossil material of Palaeacanthaspis vasta from the Devonian (Lochkovian) Chortkiv Formation (Ukraine), and a study on the phylogenetic relationships of this species, is published by Dupret et al. (2021).

== Acanthodians ==
Name	Novelty	Status	Authors	Age	Type locality	Country	Notes	Images
Dobunnacanthus	Gen. et comb. nov	Valid	Dearden et al.	Devonian		United Kingdom	A new genus for "Vernicomacanthus" waynensis Miles (1973)	
Nostolepis digitus	Sp. nov	Valid	Li et al.	Devonian (Lochkovian)	Xitun Formation	China		
Nostolepis qujingensis	Sp. nov	Valid	Li et al.	Devonian (Lochkovian)	Xitun Formation	China		

=== Acanthodian research ===
- A study on the development of teeth in acanthodians, and on its implications for the knowledge of the evolution of teeth of jawed vertebrates, is published by Rücklin et al. (2021).
- A study on the anatomy of teeth, jaws and associated oral structures of acanthodians, and on their implications for the knowledge of the evolution of dentition of modern cartilaginous fishes, is published by Dearden & Giles (2021).

== Cartilaginous fishes ==
Name	Novelty	Status	Authors	Age	Type locality	Location	Notes	Images
Aquilolamna	Gen. et sp. nov		Vullo et al.	Late Cretaceous (Turonian)	Agua Nueva Formation	Mexico	A probable planktivorous shark placed in the new family Aquilolamnidae, of uncertain placement. Possibly a member of Lamniformes. The type species is A. milarcae.	
Carcharhinus dudoni	Sp. nov	Valid	Canevet & Lebrun	Miocene		France	A species of Carcharhinus.	
Carcharhinus pedronii	Sp. nov	Valid	Canevet & Lebrun	Miocene		France	A species of Carcharhinus.	
Carcharhinus tingae	Sp. nov	Valid	Cicimurri & Ebersole	Eocene (Bartonian)		United States (Louisiana)	A species of Carcharhinus.	
Cladodus gailensis	Sp. nov	Valid	Feichtinger et al.	Carboniferous (Serpukhovian)		Austria		
Dracopristis	Gen. et sp. nov	Valid	Hodnett et al.	Late Carboniferous (Kasimovian)	Atrasado Formation	United States (New Mexico)	A medium-sized ctenacanthiform shark known from a complete skeleton with soft tissue. The type species is D. hoffmanorum.	
Durnonovariaodus	Gen. et sp. nov	Valid	Stumpf et al.	Late Jurassic (Tithonian)	Kimmeridge Clay	United Kingdom	A member of the family Hybodontidae. The type species is D. maiseyi.	
Favusodus	Gen. et sp. nov	Valid	Li et al.	Triassic (Ladinian–Carnian)		China	A member of Euselachii. Genus includes new species F. orientalis.	
Junggarensis	Gen. et sp. nov	Valid	Roelofs et al.	Devonian (Famennian)		Mongolia	Genus includes new species J. ambiguus.	
Keichouodus	Gen. et sp. nov	Valid	Li et al.	Triassic (Ladinian–Carnian)		China	A member of Euselachii. Genus includes new species K. nimaiguensis.	
Keuperodus	Gen. et comb. nov	Valid	Ivanov, Duffin & Richter	Late Triassic (Carnian)	Arden Sandstone Formation; Grabfeld Formation	Germany; United Kingdom	A member of the family Jalodontidae. Genus includes "Phoebodus" brodiei Woodward (1893) (interpreted by Ivanov, Duffin & Richter, 2021 as a senior synonym of "Phoebodus" keuperinus Seilacher, 1948).	
Lilamna	Gen. et comb. nov	Valid	Greenfield	late Eocene or Cretaceous (uncertain)		China	A possible member of the family Pseudoscapanorhynchidae. The type species is "Archaeolamna" apophysata Li (1997).	
Maiseyacanthus	Gen. et sp. nov	Valid	Bronson	Carboniferous (Mississippian)	Fayetteville Shale	United States (Arkansas)	A symmoriiform. The type species is M. ozarkanum.	
Maiseyodus	Gen. et comb. nov	Valid	Long et al.	Devonian (Emsian)	Cravens Peak Beds	Australia	A member of the family Mcmurdodontidae; a new genus for "Mcmurdodus" whitei Turner & Young (1987).	
Moskovirhynchus	Gen. et sp. nov	Valid	Popov & Shapovalov	Late Jurassic		Russia	A chimaera belonging to the family Callorhinchidae. Genus includes new species M. robustus.	
Nebriimimus	Gen. et sp. nov	Valid	Collareta et al.	Pliocene (Zanclean)		Italy; Spain	A member of Rajiformes, possibly a skate. The type species is N. wardi.	
Negaprion cossardi	Sp. nov	Valid	Canevet & Lebrun	Miocene		France	A species of Negaprion.	
Phoebodus curvatus	Sp. nov	Valid	Ivanov	Devonian (Givetian–Frasnian)		Australia; Poland; Russia		
Protochimaera	Gen. et sp. nov	Valid	Lebedev & Popov in Lebedev et al.	Carboniferous (Viséan–Serpukhovian)	Dashkovo Formation	Russia (Moscow Oblast)	A chimaera. Genus includes new species P. mirabilis.	
Pseudocorax kindlimanni	Sp. nov	In press	Jambura, Stumpf & Kriwet	Late Cretaceous (Cenomanian)	Sannine Formation	Lebanon		
Ptychodus maghrebianus	Sp. nov	In press	Amadori et al.	Late Cretaceous (Turonian)		Morocco		
Reifella	Gen. et sp. nov	Valid	Ivanov in Ivanov et al.	Permian (Roadian)	Cutoff Formation	United States (Texas)	A member of the family Anachronistidae. Genus includes new species R. lata.	
Rosaodus	Gen. et sp. nov	Valid	Li et al.	Triassic (Ladinian–Carnian)		China	A member of Elasmobranchii of uncertain phylogenetic placement. Genus includes new species R. xingyiensis.	
Strophodus indicus	Sp. nov	Valid	Sharma & Singh	Middle Jurassic (Bathonian)	Jaisalmer Formation	India	Marine hybodont shark	
Strophodus jaisalmerensis	Sp. nov	In press	Kumar et al.	Jurassic	Jaisalmer Formation	India	A hybodont shark.	
Taeniurops sergiomorai	Sp. nov		Laurito & Valerio	Miocene–Pliocene (Messinian–Piacenzian)	Uscari Formation	Costa Rica	A stingray, a species of Taeniurops.	
Triodus aeduorum	Sp. nov	Valid	Luccisano et al.	Early Permian	Autun Basin	France		
Vallisodus	Nom. nov	Valid	Duffin	Late Triassic	Penarth Group	United Kingdom	A member of Neoselachii; a replacement name for Vallisia Duffin (1982).	

=== Cartilaginous fish research ===
- Description of new fossil material of Gualepis elegans from the Lower Devonian of Yunnan (China), and a study on the phylogenetic relationships of this fish, is published by Cui et al. (2021).
- Mottequin et al. (2021) reject the interpretation of Spiraxis interstrialis as chondrichthyan egg cases, and evaluate the implications of this reinterpretation for the knowledge of the evolution of oviparity in cartilaginous fishes.
- Description of the first known skull remains of Onchopristis numidus from the Cretaceous Kem Kem Group (Morocco), and a study on the anatomy and phylogenetic relationships of this species, is published by Villalobos-Segura et al. (2021), who name a new family Onchopristidae.
- New, exceptionally well-preserved skeleton of Asteracanthus ornatissimus, preserved with teeth that markedly differ from other teeth referred to Asteracanthus, is described from the Tithonian Altmühltal Formation (Germany) by Stumpf et al. (2021), who interpret this specimen as indicating that Asteracanthus and Strophodus represent two valid genera distinct from all other hybodontiforms.
- A study on the morphological diversity of teeth of lamniform sharks from mid-Cretaceous assemblages in Australia, and on its implications for the knowledge of the composition of mid-Cretaceous shark communities and their recovery in the aftermath of the Cenomanian-Turonian boundary event, is published by Bazzi, Kear & Siversson (2021).
- A study on the biomechanics of teeth of five species of Otodus, aiming to assess the functional significance of morphological trends in otodontid teeth and to test whether the morphology of otodontid teeth enabled the transition from piscivory to predation on marine mammals and the evolution of titanic body sizes, is published by Ballell & Ferrón (2021)
- A study on a bonebed in the Oligocene Chandler Bridge Formation (South Carolina, United States) with a large sample of Carcharocles angustidens dominated by small teeth is published by Miller, Gibson & Boessenecker (2021), who interpret this bonebed as a nursery area for C. angustidens.
- A study on growth patterns, reproductive biology and likely lifespan of Otodus megalodon is published by Shimada et al. (2021).
- Perez, Leder & Badaut (2021) present a novel method for estimating body size in fossil lamniform sharks, and attempt to determine the body size of Otodus megalodon.
- Revision of the fossil record of the extant tiger shark and the extinct members of the tiger shark lineage is published by Türtscher et al. (2021).
- Redescription of Striatolamia tchelkarnurensis is published by Malyshkina (2021).
- Shark teeth which might represent the first occurrence of the blacknose shark in the Pacific Ocean are described from the Pliocene Upper Onzole Formation (Ecuador) by Collareta et al. (2021), who evaluate the implications of this finding for the knowledge of the evolutionary history of the blacknose shark and the whitenose shark.
- Two fossil teeth of the blacktip shark are reported from lower Pliocene marine deposits of Tuscany (Italy) by Collareta et al. (2021), representing the first known occurrence of this species in the fossil record from both Europe and the Mediterranean Basin.
- A study on the morphological diversity of extant and fossil shark teeth, and on their implications for the knowledge of the evolution of lamniform and carcharhiniform sharks throughout the last 83 million years, is published by Bazzi et al. (2021).
- A study on the evolutionary history of sharks across the Cretaceous–Paleogene extinction event, as indicated by morphological diversity of shark teeth across the Cretaceous–Paleogene interval, is published by Bazzi et al. (2021).
- Evidence of a previously unknown major extinction of sharks in the early Miocene, ~19 million years ago, is presented by Sibert & Rubin (2021); the study is subsequently criticized by Naylor et al. (2021) and Feichtinger et al. (2021).
- A study on shark scales from mid-Holocene (~7,000-y-old) and modern reef sediments in Bocas del Toro (Panama), aiming to determine changes of shark abundance in this area since the mid-Holocene and their possible causes, is published by Dillon et al. (2021).

== Ray-finned fishes ==
Name	Novelty	Status	Authors	Age	Type locality	Country	Notes	Images
Agoultpycnodus	Gen. et comb. nov	Valid	Taverne & Capasso	Late Cretaceous (Cenomanian-Turonian)	Akrabou Formation	Morocco	A member of the family Pycnodontidae. The type species is A. aldrovandii.	
Alilepis texasensis	Sp. nov	Valid	Bakaev in Ivanov et al.	Permian (Roadian)	Cutoff Formation	United States (Texas)	A member of the family Elonichthyidae.	
Anomoeodus aegypticus	Sp. nov	Valid	Capasso et al.	Late Cretaceous (Maastrichtian)	Dakhla Formation	Egypt	A member of Pycnodontiformes.	
Anomoeodus caddoi	Sp. nov	Valid	Suarez et al.	Early Cretaceous (Albian)	Holly Creek Formation	United States (Arkansas)	A member of Pycnodontiformes.	
Apuliadercetis gonzalezae	Sp. nov	In press	Díaz-Cruz, Alvarado-Ortega & Cantalice	Late Cretaceous (Campanian)	Angostura Formation	Mexico	A member of Aulopiformes belonging to the family Dercetidae.	
Austelliscus	Gen. et sp. nov		Figueroa, Weinschütz & Friedman	Middle Devonian or older	Paraná Basin	Brazil	An early ray-finned fish. Genus includes new species A. ferox.	
Auxis koreanus	Sp. nov	Valid	Nam, Nazarkin & Bannikov	Middle Miocene	Duho Formation	South Korea	A species of Auxis.	
Bardackichthys	Gen. et sp. nov	In press	Hacker & Shimada	Late Cretaceous (Cenomanian)	Woodbine Formation	United States (Texas)	A member of Ichthyodectiformes. Genus includes new species B. carteri.	
Bobbitichthys	Gen. et comb. nov	Valid	Schwarzhans, Milàn & Carnevale	Paleocene (Selandian)	Kerteminde Marl	Denmark	A member of the family Macrouridae. The type species is "Hymenocephalus" rosenkrantzi Schwarzhans (2003).	
Brauccipycnodus	Gen. et comb. nov	Valid	Taverne & Capasso	Early Cretaceous (Albian)		Italy	A member of the family Pycnodontidae. The type species is "Proscinetes" pillae Capasso (2007).	
Briveichthys	Gen. et sp. nov	Valid	Štamberg & Steyer	Permian	Brive Basin	France	A pygopterid. Genus includes new species B. chantepieorum.	
Capromimus undulatus	Sp. nov		Schwarzhans & Nielsen	Early Miocene	Navidad Formation	Chile	A species of Capromimus.	
Cheirolepis jonesi	Sp. nov	In press	Newman et al.	Devonian (Givetian)	Tordalen Formation	Norway		
Choichix	Gen. et sp. nov	Valid	Cantalice, Than-Marchese & Villalobos-Segura	Late Cretaceous (Cenomanian)		Mexico	A member of Acanthopterygii of uncertain phylogenetic placement. Genus includes new species C. alvaradoi.	
Clarotes eocenicus	Sp. nov	Valid	Murray & Holmes	Late Eocene	Jebel Qatrani Formation	Egypt	A species of Clarotes.	
Coccolepis solnhofensis	Sp. nov	Valid	López-Arbarello & Ebert	Late Jurassic (Tithonian)	Altmühltal Formation	Germany	A member of Chondrostei belonging to the family Coccolepididae.	
Ctenopharyngodon orientalis	Sp. nov	Valid	Su, Chang & Chen	Miocene	Xiacaowan Formation	China	A species of Ctenopharyngodon.	
Ctenopharyngodon xiejiaensis	Sp. nov	Valid	Su, Chang & Chen	Miocene	Xiejia Formation	China	A species of Ctenopharyngodon.	
Dezaoia	Gen. et sp. nov	Valid	Su, Chang & Chen	Oligocene	Ulanbulage Formation	China	A member of the family Cyprinidae belonging to the subfamily Squaliobarbinae. The type species is D. saintjaquensis.	
Diastemapycnodus	Gen. et sp. nov	In press	Abu El-Kheir et al.	Late Cretaceous (Maastrichtian)	Dakhla Formation	Egypt	A member of Pycnodontiformes. Genus includes new species D. tavernensis.	
Elongofuro augustilgi	Sp. nov	Valid	Ebert	Late Jurassic (Kimmeridgian)	Nusplingen Limestone	Germany	A member of Ophiopsiformes.	
Eoctenopharyngodon	Gen. et sp. nov	Valid	Su, Chang & Chen	Oligocene	Dongying Formation	China	A member of the family Cyprinidae belonging to the subfamily Squaliobarbinae. The type species is E. liui.	
Eotexachara	Gen. et sp. nov	In press	Wick	Late Cretaceous (Campanian)	Aguja Formation	United States (Texas)	A member of Characiformes. Genus includes new species E. malateres.	
Feroxichthys panzhouensis	Sp. nov	Valid	Ma, Xu & Geng	Middle Triassic (Anisian)	Guanling Formation	China	A member of the family Colobodontidae.	
Garganomyctophum	Gen. et sp. nov	Valid	Taverne	Late Cretaceous (Santonian)		Italy	A lanternfish. The type species is G. sorbinii.	
Guiclupea	Gen. et sp. nov	Valid	Chen et al.	Oligocene		China	A member of Clupeomorpha belonging to the group Ellimmichthyiformes. The type species is G. superstes.	
Katyagobius	Gen. et sp. nov	Valid	Reichenbacher & Bannikov	Miocene		Moldova	A member of the family Gobiidae. The type species is K. prikryli.	
Kelliaichthys	Nom. nov	Valid	Schultze in Schultze et al.			Kazakhstan	A replacement name for Kellia Kazantseva-Selezneva (1980).	
Krumvirichthys	Gen. et sp. nov	Valid	Přikryl	Oligocene–early Miocene		Czech Republic	A deep-sea smelt. The type species is K. brzobohatyi.	
Neuburgichthys	Nom. nov	Valid	Schultze in Schultze et al.			Kazakhstan	A replacement name for Neuburgia Kazantseva-Selezneva (1980).	
Oshiaichthys	Nom. nov	Valid	Schultze in Schultze et al.	Triassic		Kyrgyzstan	A replacement name for Oshia Sytchevskaya (1999).	
Palaeopantodon	Gen. et sp. nov	Valid	Taverne	Late Cretaceous (Cenomanian)		Lebanon	A member of the family Pantodontidae. The type species is P. vandersypeni.	
Pankowskipiscis	Gen. et sp. nov	Valid	Taverne	Late Cretaceous (Cenomanian)		Lebanon	A member of the family Pantodontidae. The type species is P. haqelensis.	
Peltoperleidus asiaticus	Sp. nov	Valid	Xu	Middle Triassic (Anisian)	Guanling Formation	China	A member of Neopterygii belonging to the group Louwoichthyiformes.	
Petersichthys	Gen. et sp. nov	Valid	Taverne	Late Cretaceous (Cenomanian)		Lebanon	A member of the family Pantodontidae. The type species is P. libanicus.	
Pinichthys shirvanensis	Sp. nov	Valid	Bannikov	Miocene		Russia (Krasnodar Krai)	A member of Perciformes belonging to the group Stromateoidei.	
Portentosoceros	Gen. et comb. nov	Valid	Nazarkin & Bannikov	Miocene		Russia (Sakhalin Oblast)	A member of Percoidei of uncertain phylogenetic placement; a new genus for "Pentaceros" sakhalinicus Gretchina (1975).	
Primuluchara	Gen. et sp. nov	In press	Wick	Late Cretaceous (Campanian)	Aguja Formation Dinosaur Park Formation	United States (Texas) Canada (Alberta)	A member of Characiformes. Genus includes new species P. laramidensis.	
Pseudohilsa nikosi	Sp. nov	Valid	Kevrekidis, Arratia & Reichenbacher in Kevrekidis et al.	Late Miocene		Greece	A member of the family Clupeidae.	
Pseudolesueurigobius	Gen. et sp. nov	Valid	Reichenbacher & Bannikov	Miocene		Moldova	A member of the family Gobiidae. The type species is P. manfredi.	
Pteronisculus changae	Sp. nov	Valid	Ren & Xu	Middle Triassic (Anisian)	Guanling Formation	China		
Raususetarches	Gen. et sp. nov	Valid	Yabumoto & Nazarkin	Late Miocene	Koshikawa Formation	Japan	A member of the family Scorpaenidae. Genus includes new species R. sakurai.	
Sarmatigobius	Gen. et sp. et comb. nov	Valid	Reichenbacher & Bannikov	Miocene		Moldova	A member of the family Gobiidae. The type species is S. compactus; genus also includes "Hesperichthys" iugosus Schwarzhans, Brzobohatý & Radwańska (2020).	
Saurichthys sceltrichensis	Sp. nov	Valid	Renesto, Magnani & Stockar	Middle Triassic (Ladinian)	Meride Limestone	Switzerland		
Wilsonium	Gen. et comb. nov	Valid	Liu	Early Eocene	Allenby Formation	Canada (British Columbia)	A Catostomidae sucker. The type species is "Amyzon" brevipinne (1893).	
Yarigobius	Gen. et 2 sp. nov	Valid	Reichenbacher & Bannikov	Miocene		Moldova	A member of the family Gobiidae. The type species is Y. decoratus; genus also includes Y. naslavcensis.	

=== Otolith taxa ===
Name	Novelty	Status	Authors	Age	Type locality	Country	Notes	Images
Achirus australis	Sp. nov		Schwarzhans & Nielsen	Early Miocene	Lacui Formation; Navidad Formation	Chile	A species of Achirus.	
Achirus chungkuz	Sp. nov		Schwarzhans & Nielsen	Early Miocene	Lacui Formation; Navidad Formation	Chile	A species of Achirus.	
Agonopsis cume	Sp. nov		Schwarzhans & Nielsen	Early Miocene	Lacui Formation; Navidad Formation	Chile	A species of Agonopsis.	
Aphanolebias bettinae	Sp. nov	In press	Bradić-Milinović, Rundić & Schwarzhans	Miocene		Serbia	A member of the family Valenciidae.	
Archaemacruroides vanknippenbergi	Sp. nov	In press	Schwarzhans & Jagt	Late Cretaceous (Maastrichtian)	Maastricht Formation	Belgium Netherlands	A member of Gadiformes of uncertain phylogenetic placement.	
Ariosoma mesohellenica	Sp. nov	Valid	Agiadi, Koskeridou & Thivaiou	Miocene (Aquitanian)		Greece	A species of Ariosoma.	
Chiloconger chilensis	Sp. nov		Schwarzhans & Nielsen	Early Miocene	Navidad Formation	Chile	A species of Chiloconger.	
Citharichthys parvisulcus	Sp. nov		Schwarzhans & Nielsen	Early Miocene	Ipún beds Lacui Formation; Navidad Formation; Ranquil Formation	Chile	A species of Citharichthys.	
Citharichthys vergens	Sp. nov		Schwarzhans & Nielsen	Early Miocene	Lacui Formation Navidad Formation	Chile	A species of Citharichthys.	
Coelorinchus fidelis	Sp. nov		Schwarzhans & Nielsen	Early Miocene	Ipún Beds Lacui Formation; Navidad Formation	Chile	A species of Coelorinchus.	
Coelorinchus rapelanus	Sp. nov		Schwarzhans & Nielsen	Early Miocene	Navidad Formation	Chile	A species of Coelorinchus.	
Cottunculus primaevus	Sp. nov		Schwarzhans & Nielsen	Early Miocene	Lacui Formation Navidad Formation	Chile	A species of Cottunculus.	
Cretaserranus	Gen. et sp. nov	In press	Schwarzhans & Jagt	Late Cretaceous (Maastrichtian)	Maastricht Formation	Belgium Netherlands	A member of Perciformes, possibly belonging to the family Serranidae. Genus includes new species C. maastrichtensis.	
Gnathophis elongatus	Sp. nov	Valid	Agiadi, Koskeridou & Thivaiou	Miocene (Aquitanian)		Greece	A species of Gnathophis.	
Gnathophis quinzioi	Sp. nov		Schwarzhans & Nielsen	Early Miocene	Navidad Formation	Chile	A species of Gnathophis.	
Gobiosoma? axsmithi	Sp. nov	Valid	Ebersole, Cicimurri & Stringer	Oligocene (Rupelian)	Byram Formation	United States (Alabama)	A member of the family Gobiidae.	
Hellenigobius	Gen. et sp. et comb. nov	Valid	Schwarzhans, Agiadi & Thivaiou	Miocene		Czech Republic Greece; Italy; Kazakhstan; Serbia; Hungary?	A member of the subfamily Gobionellinae. The type species is H. praeschismatus; genus also includes "Pomatoschistus" bunyatovi Bratishko et al. (2015).	
Klincigobus haraldahnelti	Sp. nov	In press	Bradić-Milinović, Rundić & Schwarzhans	Miocene		Serbia	A member of the family Gobiidae.	
Kuhlia orientalis	Sp. nov		Schwarzhans & Nielsen	Early Miocene	Lacui Formation Navidad Formation	Chile	A flagtail.	
Lampanyctus ipunensis	Sp. nov		Schwarzhans & Nielsen	Early Miocene	Ipún beds	Chile New Zealand	A species of Lampanyctus.	
Larimichthys koae	Sp. nov	In press	Lin & Chien	Late Miocene	Tapu Formation	Taiwan	A species of Larimichthys.	
Lepophidium chonorum	Sp. nov		Schwarzhans & Nielsen	Early Miocene	Lacui Formation Navidad Formation	Chile	A species of Lepophidium.	
Lepophidium mapucheorum	Sp. nov		Schwarzhans & Nielsen	Early Miocene	Navidad Formation	Chile	A species of Lepophidium.	
Maurolicus brevirostris	Sp. nov		Schwarzhans & Nielsen	Early Miocene	Navidad Formation	Chile	A species of Maurolicus.	
Navidadichthys	Gen. et sp. nov		Schwarzhans & Nielsen	Early Miocene	Navidad Formation	Chile	Possibly a member of the family Prototroctidae. The type species is N. mirus.	
Nezumia epuge	Sp. nov		Schwarzhans & Nielsen	Early Miocene	Lacui Formation Navidad Formation	Chile	A species of Nezumia.	
Nibea chaoi	Sp. nov	In press	Lin & Chien	Late Miocene	Tapu Formation	Taiwan	A species of Nibea.	
Paracarapus	Gen. et sp. nov		Schwarzhans & Nielsen	Early Miocene	Navidad Formation	Chile	A pearlfish. The type species is P. chilensis.	
Physiculus pichi	Sp. nov		Schwarzhans & Nielsen	Early Miocene	Navidad Formation	Chile	A species of Physiculus.	
Plesiogobius	Gen. et sp. et comb. nov	Valid	Schwarzhans, Agiadi & Thivaiou	Miocene (Aquitanian)		Greece	A member of the family Gobiidae belonging to the subfamily Gobiinae. The type species is P. felliensis.	
Polyipnus bandeli	Sp. nov		Schwarzhans & Nielsen	Early Miocene	Navidad Formation	Chile	A species of Polyipnus.	
Pseudonus humilis	Sp. nov		Schwarzhans & Nielsen	Early Miocene	Ipún beds Navidad Formation	Chile	A species of Pseudonus.	
Pterothrissus transpacificus	Sp. nov		Schwarzhans & Nielsen	Early Miocene	Navidad Formation	Chile	A species of Pterothrissus.	
Pythonichthys panulus	Sp. nov		Schwarzhans & Nielsen	Early Miocene	Lacui Formation	Chile	A species of Pythonichthys.	
Rhinocephalus cretaceus	Sp. nov	In press	Schwarzhans & Jagt	Late Cretaceous (Maastrichtian)	Maastricht Formation	Belgium	A member of the family Merlucciidae.	
Rhynchoconger chiloensis	Sp. nov		Schwarzhans & Nielsen	Early Miocene	Navidad Formation	Chile	A species of Rhynchoconger.	
Severnichthus	Gen. et sp. nov	In press	Stringer & Schwarzhans	Late Cretaceous (Maastrichtian)	Severn Formation	United States (Maryland)	Possibly a member of Polymixiiformes. Genus includes new species S. bourdoni.	
Sirembola supersa	Sp. nov		Schwarzhans & Nielsen	Early Miocene	Lacui Formation	Chile	A cusk-eel.	
Spectrunculus sparsus	Sp. nov		Schwarzhans & Nielsen	Early Miocene	Navidad Formation	Chile	A species of Spectrunculus.	
Taosciaena	Gen. et 2 sp. nov	In press	Lin & Chien	Late Miocene	Tapu Formation	Taiwan	A member of the family Sciaenidae. The type species is T. jiangi; genus also includes T. hui.	
Toxopyge vracevicensis	Sp. nov	In press	Bradić-Milinović, Rundić & Schwarzhans	Miocene		Serbia	A member of the family Gobiidae.	

=== Ray-finned fish research ===
- Putative paraxial ossicle of a member of the family Molidae, possibly representing the first fossil find of the genus Mola from the Mediterranean Basin reported to date, is described from the Miocene Pietra Leccese Formation (Apulia, Italy) by Collareta et al. (2021).
- A platysomid specimen, representing the earliest deep-bodied actinopterygian reported to date, is described from the Carboniferous (Tournaisian) Horton Bluff Formation (Canada) by Wilson, Mansky & Anderson (2021), who evaluate the implications of this findings for the knowledge of the evolution of early ray-finned fishes.
- A review of the fossil record of Early–Middle Triassic marine bony fishes, aiming to determine the implications of poor fossil record from the late Olenekian-early middle Anisian interval on the knowledge of the Triassic radiation of bony fishes, is published by Romano (2021).
- A diverse assemblage of late Maastrichtian and Paleocene ray-finned fishes is described from Evrytania (Greece) by Argyriou & Davesne (2021).
- A study on the diversity of fishes from upper Paleocene microfossil localities in the Ravenscrag Formation (Saskatchewan, Canada) is published by Sinha et al. (2021).
- New fish fauna dating to the Paleocene–Eocene Thermal Maximum, indicating that diverse fish communities thrived in the paleotropics during this time period, is reported from Egypt by El-Sayed et al. (2021).
- Heingård et al. (2021) report preservation of residues of both internal and integumentary tissues in the form of dark organic stains in fossil fish larvae from the Eocene (Ypresian) Stolleklint Clay (Ølst Formation, Denmark).
- Revision of the fossil material of sturgeons from the Upper Miocene deposits of southern Ukraine is published by Hilton, Kovalchuk & Podoplelova (2021).
- A study on the morphological diversity and evolution of pycnodontiforms is published by Cawley et al. (2021).
- A study on fossil crushing dentitions of Pycnodus zeaformis and P. maliensis, providing evidence of a distinct pattern of gap-filling tooth addition in pycnodonts, with individual large teeth replaced by multiple small teeth, is published by Collins & Underwood (2021).
- A study on the histology of teeth and bones of Neoproscinetes penalvai and bones of Tepexichthys aranguthyorum is published by Meunier et al. (2021).
- A redescription of Atacamichthys greeni is published by Arratia et al. (2021), who interpret it as a stem-group teleost, and name the new family Atacamichthyidae.
- Revision of members of the clade Archaeomaenidae is published by Bean (2021), who considers Madariscus robustus to be a junior synonym of Archaeomaene tenuis.
- A study on genome size evolution in fossil stem-group teleosts (based on data from bone cell volumes in fossil specimens), aiming to determine the timing of whole-genome duplication in the evolutionary history of teleosts, is published by Davesne et al. (2021).
- New fossil material of elopomorphs, including the earliest records of members of the genera Albula and Paralbula from Gondwana reported to date and one of the earliest records of the genus Egertonia, is described from the Upper Cretaceous Mahajanga Basin (Madagascar) by Ostrowski (2021).
- A study on the evolutionary history of lanternfishes, primarily based on the fossil record of otoliths, is published by Schwarzhans & Carnevale (2021).
- Armbruster & Lujan (2021) identify Taubateia paraiba as a member of Rhinelepinae.

== Lobe-finned fishes ==
Name	Novelty	Status	Authors	Age	Type locality	Country	Notes	Images
Ceratodus guanganensis	Sp. nov	Valid	Wang et al.	Late Jurassic	Shaximiao Formation	China	Announced in 2021; the final version of the article naming it was published in 2022.	
Eusthenodon bourdoni	Sp. nov	Valid	Downs, Barbosa & Daeschler	Devonian (Famennian)	Catskill Formation	United States (Pennsylvania)		

=== Lobe-finned fish research ===
- A coelacanth specimen belonging or related to the species Heptanema paradoxum is described from the Ladinian Meride Limestone (Switzerland) by Renesto, Magnani & Stockar (2021), representing the first known coelacanth specimen from the Middle Triassic that undoubtedly bears elongate thin ribs.
- Fossil material of mawsoniid coelacanths is described from the marine Rhaetian Bonenburg locality (Germany) by Hartung et al. (2021), who interpret this finding as indicating that mawsoniids were already present in Europe in the Late Triassic, and that they inhabited marine environments at the end of the Triassic.
- Fossil material of a member of genus Mawsonia is described from the Cenomanian Woodbine Formation (Texas, United States; representing the first Cretaceous North American mawsoniid coelacanth reported to date) by Cavin et al. (2021), who evaluate the implications of this finding for the knowledge of potential factors that might have made long survival of the genera Mawsonia and Latimeria possible.
- An ossified lung of a mawsoniid coelacanth is described from the Maastrichtian of Oued Zem (Morocco) by Brito et al. (2021), representing the last known record of a Mesozoic coelacanth and the first known occurrence of coelacanths in the phosphate deposits of North Africa.
- A study on the evolution of feeding modes among tetrapodomorphs, as indicated by the anatomy of the skull of Tiktaalik roseae, is published by Lemberg, Daeschler & Shubin (2021), who report the simultaneous occurrence of anatomical modifications of the skull for prey capture through biting, as well as joint morphologies suggestive of cranial kinesis that is also present in suction-feeding fish.
- A study on the phylogenetic relationships of extant and fossil coelacanths is published by Toriño, Soto & Perea (2021).
- A study on the morphology and histology of the scales of Miguashaia bureaui, and on its implications for the knowledge of the evolution of the squamation in coelacanths, is published by Mondéjar-Fernández et al. (2021).
- New fossil remains representing one of the largest known coelacanths ever reported are described from the Middle Jurassic of Normandy (France) by Cavin et al. (2021), who also compare the relationship between taxic diversity and body size diversity in coelacanths and ray-finned fishes over the Devonian–Paleocene time interval.
- A study on tooth development in Powichthys thorsteinssoni, evaluating its implications for the knowledge of the evolution of the dentition of bony fishes, is published by King, Marone & Rücklin (2021).
- A study on the anatomy and phylogenetic relationships of Cladarosymblema narrienense is published by Clement et al. (2021).

== General research ==
- A study on the morphology of the earliest osteocytes in Tremataspis mammillata and Bothriolepis trautscholdi is published by Haridy et al. (2021), who interpret their findings as indicating that the earliest known osteocytes in the fossil record had similar morphology and likely similar physiological capabilities to their modern counterparts, and attempt to determine initial driver favoring evolution of cellular (osteocytic) over acellular (anosteocytic) bones in vertebrates.
- Two Permian fish assemblages consisting of cartilaginous fishes and ray-finned fishes are reported from the Madumabisa Mudstone Formation (Zambia) by Peecook et al. (2021), who compare these assemblages with middle and late Permian freshwater fish faunas from Australia, Brazil, Chile and South Africa.
- A middle Miocene freshwater fish fossil fauna is described from the Castilletes Formation (Colombia) by Ballen et al. (2021), report the presence of members of fish groups known from extant Amazonian faunas east of the Andes but absent from faunas west of the Andes, and interpret their presence as evidence that the riverine systems of the Guajira Peninsula were connected to Amazonia during the middle Miocene.
