= 1868 in paleontology =

Paleontology or palaeontology is the study of prehistoric life forms on Earth through the examination of plant and animal fossils. This includes the study of body fossils, tracks (ichnites), burrows, cast-off parts, fossilised feces (coprolites), palynomorphs and chemical residues. Because humans have encountered fossils for millennia, paleontology has a long history both before and after becoming formalized as a science. This article records significant discoveries and events related to paleontology that occurred or were published in the year 1868.

== Arthropoda ==
=== Newly named crustaceans ===
Name	Novelty	Status	Authors	Age	Unit	Location	Notes	Images
Astacus politus	Sp nov	Jr synonym	Schlüter	Early Cretaceous	Bückeberg Formation	Germany	Moved to the genus Protastacus in 1983.	
Enoploclytia paucispina	Sp nov	Valid	Schlüter			Germany	An erymid.	
Eurycarpus	Gen et sp nov	Valid	Schlüter			Germany	A decapod, type species is E. nanodactylus.	
Hoploparia macrodactyla	Sp nov	Valid	Schlüter			Germany	A lobster	
Necrocarcinus senonensis	Sp nov	Valid	Schlüter			Germany	A necrocarcinid.	
Palaeocorystes laevis	Sp nov	Jr synonym	Schlüter	Late Cretaceous (Upper Santonian)		Germany	Moved to Bournelyreidus in 2012.	
Squilla cretacea	Sp nov	Valid	Schlüter	Cretaceous		Germany	A mantis shrimp	

=== Newly named insects ===
Name	Novelty	Status	Authors	Age	Unit	Location	Notes	Images
Aphaenogaster berendti	Sp nov	jr synonym	Mayr	Middle Eocene	Baltic amber	Europe	A myrmicine ant. Moved to Stenamma berendti in 1915	Stenamma berendti
Aphaenogaster sommerfeldti	Sp nov	valid	Mayr	Middle Eocene	Baltic amber	Europe	A myrmicine ant.	Aphaenogaster sommerfeldti
Camponotus constrictus	Sp nov	Jr synonym	Mayr	Middle Eocene	Baltic amber	Europe	Fossil formicine ant., moved to Formica constrictus in 1915; Synonym of Cataglyphoides constrictus	Cataglyphoides constrictus
Camponotus mengei	Sp nov	valid	Mayr	Middle Eocene	Baltic amber	Europe	Fossil formicine ant.	Camponotus mengei
Enneamerus	Gen et 2 sp nov	valid	Mayr	Middle Eocene	Baltic amber	Europe	A myrmecine ant. 2 species	Enneamerus reticulatus
Formica flori	Sp nov	valid	Mayr	Middle Eocene	Baltic amber	Europe	Fossil formicine ant	Formica flori
Hypoclinea balticus	Sp nov	Jr synonym	Mayr	Middle Eocene	Baltic amber	Europe	Fossil Dolichoderine ant, moved to Dolichoderus balticus in 1893	Dolichoderus balticus
Hypoclinea constricta	Sp nov	Jr synonym	Mayr	Middle Eocene	Baltic amber	Europe	Fossil Dolichoderine ant, jr synonym of Yantaromyrmex constricta	Yantaromyrmex constricta
Hypoclinea cornuta	Sp nov	Jr synonym	Mayr	Middle Eocene	Baltic amber	Europe	Fossil Dolichoderine ant, moved to Dolichoderus cornutus in 1893	Dolichoderus cornutus
Hypoclinea geinitzi	Sp nov	Jr synonym	Mayr	Middle Eocene	Baltic amber	Europe	Fossil Dolichoderine ant, jr synonym of Yantaromyrmex geinitzi	Yantaromyrmex geinitzi
Hypoclinea goepperti	Sp nov	Jr synonym	Mayr	Middle Eocene	Baltic amber	Europe	Fossil Dolichoderine ant, moved to Bothriomyrmex goepperti in 1893, jr synonym of Ctenobethylus goepperti	Ctenobethylus goepperti
Hypoclinea longipennis	Sp nov	Jr synonym	Mayr	Middle Eocene	Baltic amber	Europe	Fossil Dolichoderine ant, moved to Dolichoderus longipennis in 1893	Dolichoderus longipennis
Hypoclinea sculpturata	Sp nov	Jr synonym	Mayr	Middle Eocene	Baltic amber	Europe	Fossil Dolichoderine ant, moved to Dolichoderus sculpturata in 1893	Dolichoderus sculpturatus
Hypoclinea tertiaria	Sp nov	Jr synonym	Mayr	Middle Eocene	Baltic amber	Europe	Fossil Dolichoderine ant, moved to Dolichoderus tertiaria in 1893	Dolichoderus tertiarius
Myrmica duisburgi	sp nov	jr synonym	Mayr	Middle Eocene	Baltic amber	Europe	Fossil Agroecomyrmecine ant, moved to Agroecomyrmex duisburgi in 1910	Myrmica duisburgi
Pheidologeton antiquus	sp nov	jr synonym	Mayr	Middle Eocene	Baltic amber	Europe	Fossil myrmicine ant, moved to Aeromyrma antiqua in 1891; Synonym of Carebara antiqua	Carebara antiqua
Ponera succinea	Sp nov	jr synonym	Mayr	Middle Eocene	Baltic Amber	Europe	A ponerine ant, moved to Pachycondyla succinea in 1995	Pachycondyla succinea
Prenolepis pygmaea	Sp nov	Jr synonym	Mayr	Middle Eocene	European amber	Europe	Fossil formicine ant, jr synonym of Nylanderia pygmaea	Nylanderia pygmaea
Stigmomyrmex	Gen et sp nov	valid	Mayr	Middle Eocene	European amber	Europe	A myrmicin ant. Type species S. venustus	Stigmomyrmex venustus

== Archosauromorphs ==
=== Dinosaurs ===
- Leidy collaborated with artist Benjamin Waterhouse Hawkins to mount Hadrosaurus foulkii for the Academy of Natural Sciences of Philadelphia. This became both the first mounted dinosaur skeleton ever mounted for public display and also one of the most popular exhibits in the history of the academy. Estimates have the Hadrosaurus exhibit as increasing the number of visitors by up to 50%.

==== New taxa ====
Name	Novelty	Status	Authors	Age	Unit	Location	Notes	Images
Aublysodon	Gen et sp nov	Nomen dubium	Leidy	Late Cretaceous	Judith River Formation	USA; (Montana)	Possible subjective synonym of Albertosaurus or Deinodon.	Aublysodon may be a synonym of Albertosaurus.
Diplotomodon	Gen nov	Nomen dubium	Leidy	Late Cretaceous	Navesink Formation or Hornerstown Formation	USA (New Jersey)	Possible subjective synonym of Dryptosaurus.	

== Plesiosaurs ==
=== New taxa ===
Name	Status	Authors	Notes
Elasmosaurus	Valid	Cope	

== Synapsids ==
=== Non-mammalian ===
Name	Status	Authors	Discovery year	Age	Unit	Location	Notes	Images
Pristerodon	Valid	Huxley						
