= 1893 in paleontology =

Paleontology or palaeontology is the study of prehistoric life forms on Earth through the examination of plant and animal fossils. This includes the study of body fossils, tracks (ichnites), burrows, cast-off parts, fossilised feces (coprolites), palynomorphs and chemical residues. Because humans have encountered fossils for millennia, paleontology has a long history both before and after becoming formalized as a science. This article records significant discoveries and events related to paleontology that occurred or were published in the year 1893.

== Arthropods ==
=== Newly named insects ===
Name	Novelty	Status	Authors	Age	Unit	Location	Notes	Images
Bothriomyrmex goepperti	Comb nov	Jr synonym	(Mayr, 1868)	Middle Eocene	Baltic amber	Europe	Fossil Dolichoderine ant, moved to Iridomyrmex goepperti in 1915, jr synonym of Ctenobethylus goepperti	Ctenobethylus goepperti
Dolichoderus balticus	Comb nov	valid	(Mayr, 1868)	Middle Eocene	Baltic amber	Europe	Fossil Dolichoderine ant, moved from Hypoclinea balticus	Dolichoderus balticus
Dolichoderus cornutus	Comb nov	valid	(Mayr, 1868)	Middle Eocene	Baltic amber	Europe	Fossil Dolichoderine ant, moved from Hypoclinea cornuta	Dolichoderus cornutus
Dolichoderus longipennis	Comb nov	Valid	Mayr	Middle Eocene	Baltic amber	Europe	Fossil Dolichoderine ant, moved from Hypoclinea longipennis	Dolichoderus longipennis
Dolichoderus sculpturata	Comb nov	Valid	Mayr	Middle Eocene	Baltic amber	Europe	Fossil Dolichoderine ant, moved from Hypoclinea sculpturata	Dolichoderus sculpturatus
Dolichoderus tertiaria	Comb nov	Valid	Mayr	Middle Eocene	Baltic amber	Europe	Fossil Dolichoderine ant, moved from Hypoclinea tertiaria	Dolichoderus tertiarius
Iridomyrmex haueri	Sp nov	Synonym	(Mayr, 1868)	Burdigalian	Radoboj	Croatia	A dolichoderine ant. synonym of Emplastus haueri	

== Fish ==
=== Newly named Ray-finned fish ===
Name	Novelty	Status	Authors	Age	Type locality	Location	Notes	Images
Amyzon brevipinne	Sp nov	Jr synonym	Cope	Early Eocene	Allenby Formation	Canada (British Columbia)	A catostomid sucker fish. Moved to Wilsonium brevipinne (2021).	

== Archosauromorphs ==
=== Newly named dinosaurs ===
Name	Status	Authors	Age	Unit	Location	Notes
Argyrosaurus	Valid	Richard Lydekker	Late Cretaceous (Campanian-Maastrichtian)	Bajo Barreal Formation	Argentina	Nomen dubium
Microcoelus	Nomen dubium	Richard Lydekker	Late Cretaceous (Santonian)	Bajo de la Carpa Formation	Argentina	Possible subjective synonym of Neuquensaurus.
Sarcolestes	Valid	Richard Lydekker	Middle Jurassic (Callovian)	Oxford Clay	United Kingdom	An ankylosaur.

== Plesiosaurs ==
=== New taxa ===
Name	Novelty	Status	Authors	Age	Unit	Location	Notes	Images
Pantosaurus	Gent et comb nov	Valid	Marsh	Late Jurassic (Oxfordian)	Sundance Formation	United States	A cryptoclidid	

== Synapsids ==
=== Non-mammalian ===
Name	Novelty	Status	Authors	Age	Unit	Location	Notes	Images
Callibrachion	Gen et sp nov	valid	Boule and Glangeau	Late Carboniferous-Early Permian		France	A basal Caseidae; Type species C. gaudryi	Callibrachion gaudryi
Gordonia	Gen et sp nov	Valid	Newton	Late Permian	Lossiemouth Sandstone	Scotland	A dicynodont. Type species G. traquairi	Gordonia traquairi
