= L. crocea =

L. crocea may refer to:

- Larimichthys crocea, a croaker native to the western Pacific
- Leptogaster crocea, a robber fly
- Libnotes crocea, a crane fly
