= TMEM252 =

New Information about Gene

Identifiers
- Aliases: TMEM252, C9orf71, transmembrane protein 252
- External IDs: MGI: 3583948; HomoloGene: 17717; GeneCards: TMEM252; OMA:TMEM252 - orthologs

Gene location (Human)
Chr.	Chromosome 9 (human)
Band	9q21.11	Start	68,536,580 bp
Band	9q21.11	End	68,540,883 bp

Gene location (Mouse)
Chr.	Chromosome 19 (mouse)
Band	19|19 B	Start	24,651,372 bp
Band	19|19 B	End	24,659,597 bp
RNA expression pattern
Bgee	Human / Mouse (ortholog); Top expressed in: secondary oocyte; smooth muscle tissue; human kidney; muscle layer of sigmoid colon; gastric mucosa; left uterine tube; popliteal artery; tibial arteries; right coronary artery; body of uterus / Top expressed in: proximal tubule; human kidney; right kidney; right lung; ileum; jejunum; duodenum; renal pelvis; right lung lobe; lens; More reference expression data
BioGPS	n/a
Orthologs
Species	Human	Mouse
Entrez	169693	226040
Ensembl	ENSG00000181778	ENSMUSG00000048572
UniProt	Q8N6L7	Q8C353
RefSeq (mRNA)	NM_153237	NM_183160
RefSeq (protein)	NP_694969	NP_898983
Location (UCSC)	Chr 9: 68.54 – 68.54 Mb	Chr 19: 24.65 – 24.66 Mb
PubMed search
- Wikidata
View/Edit Human	View/Edit Mouse

Transmembrane protein 252 is a protein that, in humans, is encoded by the TMEM252 gene.

== Gene ==
Transmembrane protein 252 (TMEM252), otherwise known as chromosome 9 open reading frame 71 (C9orf71), is a gene that encodes for the TMEM252 protein. This gene is found on chromosome 9, and it spans over 3000 base pairs. Additionally, this gene is made up of 2 exons, with exon 1 stopping at nucleotide 346 and exon 2 beginning at nucleotide 347. The mRNA transcript is 1261 nucleotides in length.

== Protein ==
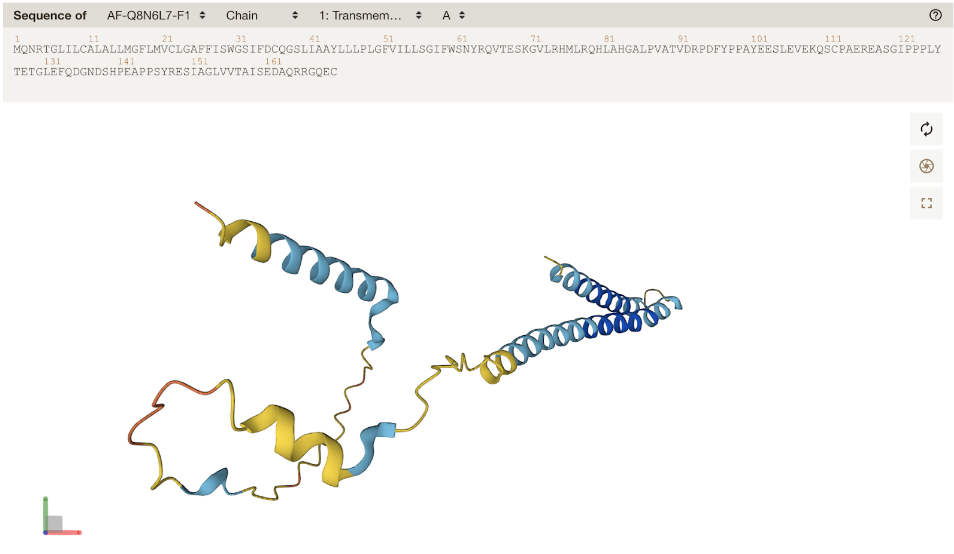
Predicted tertiary structure by the level of confidence for human protein TMEM252. The dark blue indicates the highest confidence, light blue indicates normal confidence, yellow indicates low confidence, and orange indicates very low confidence.

Conceptual translation of predicted domains and other sites within TMEM252.

The TMEM252 protein is 170 amino acids in length. There are 2 transmembrane domains and one disordered region within this protein. The predicted molecular weight of the unmodified precursor protein is 18.7 kDa. The theoretical isoelectric point of this precursor protein is 4.88. There are no known isoforms of TMEM252.

== Expression ==
This gene is expressed mainly in the kidney and small intestine of humans; however, there are 10 other organs in which TMEM252 is expressed, just at a lower rate. When RNA sequencing was done among 20 tissues, it was found that the kidney and prostate had the highest expression for TMEM252. In the fetal development of a baby, the highest expression of TMEM252 is in the 10-week heart and kidney, and the 20-week stomach and intestine. There is consistency between these expressions, as it can be concluded that the most prominent tissue expression of TMEM252 is in the kidney.

== Homology and evolutionary history ==
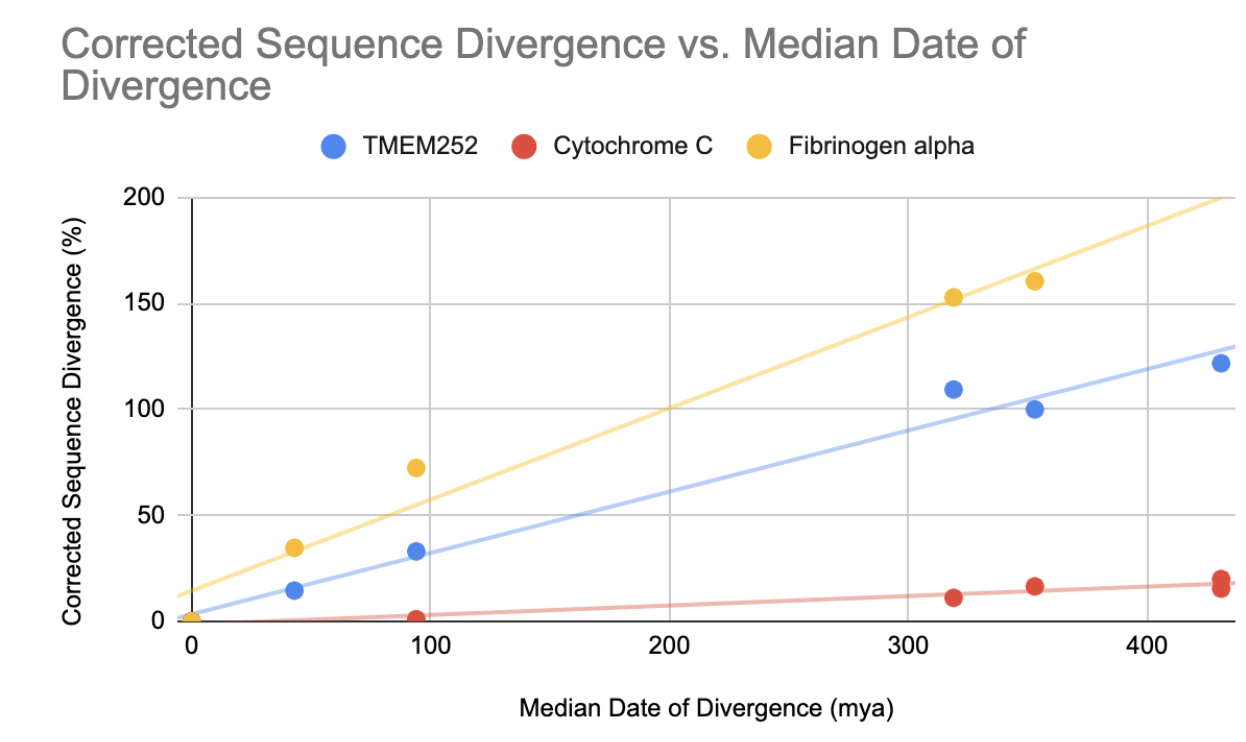
Corrected sequence divergence (%) for TMEM252 (NP_694969.1), Cytochrome C (NP_061820), and Fibrinogen alpha (NP_068657) in multiple orthologs compared to the median date of divergence.

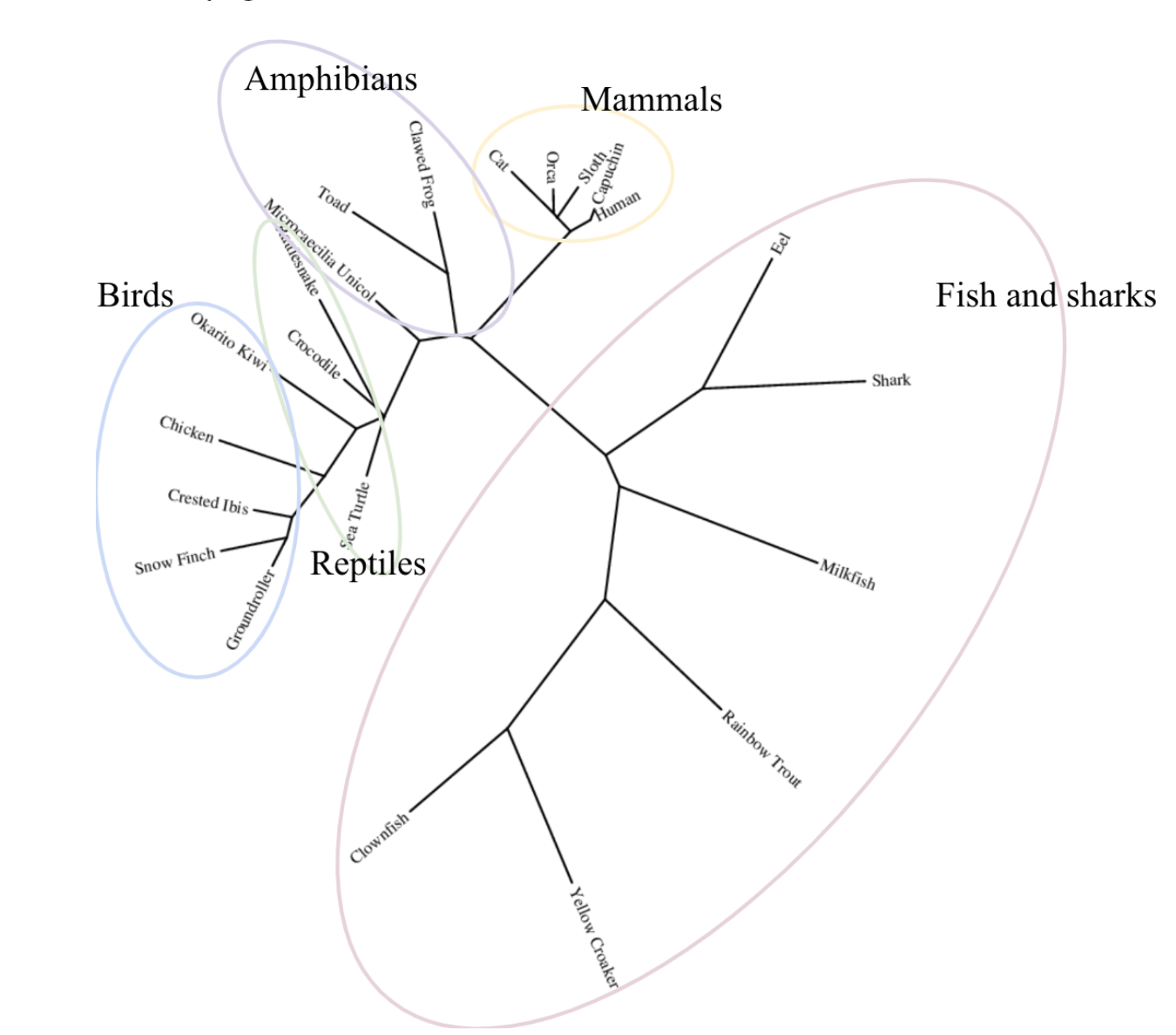
Unrooted phylogenetic tree of TMEM252 ancestry. The accession numbers for these organisms can be found in the ortholog table. As shown, mammals are marked with a yellow circle, amphibians are marked with a purple circle, reptiles with a green circle, birds with a blue circle, and fish and sharks with a pink circle.

TMEM252 can be found in mammals, reptiles, birds, amphibians, and fish. TMEM252 first appeared in fish about 431 million years ago. This was the first occurrence of this gene. There are no orthologs for this gene in jawless vertebrates, invertebrates, plants and fungi. Additionally, there are no paralogs of TMEM252.

TMEM252 first appeared in fish about 431 million years ago. TMEM252 is evolving relatively quickly compared to fibrinogen alpha.

Table of TMEM252 Orthologs
Genus and Species	Common Name	Order	Date of Divergence (MYA)	Accession Number	Length (AA)	% Identity w Humans	% Similarity w Humans
Homo sapiens	Human	primate	0	NP_694969.1	170	100	100%
Cebus imitator	Panamanian White-Faced Capuchin	primate	43	XP_017398911.1	170	86.5	90.60%
Orcinus orca	Orca	cetacea	94	XP_004276471.1	171	71.9	82.50%
Choloepus didactylus	Linnaeus's Two-Toed Sloth	pilosa	99	XP_037707165.1	170	72.4	82.90%
Crotalus tigris	Tiger Rattlesnake	squamata	319	XP_039218251.1	168	38.9	54.10%
Gallus gallus	Chicken	galliformes	319	XP_046791631.1	177	35	52.50%
Caretta caretta	Loggerhead Sea Turtle	testudines	319	XP_048705310.1	193	34.5	49.50%
Crocodylus porosus	Saltwater Crocodile	crocodilia	319	XP_019410953.1	196	33.8	49.00%
Nipponia nippon	Crested Ibis	pelecaniformes	319	XP_009460509.1	167	33.5	50.80%
Apteryx rowi	Okarito Kiwi	apterygiformes	319	XP_025915801.1	188	33.2	48.70%
Brachypteracias leptosomus	Short-legged Ground-roller	coraciiformes	319	NXS61352.1	175	32.1	44.90%
Onychostruthus taczanowskii	White-rumped Snow Finch	passeridae	319	XP_041282844.1	194	29.2	44.80%
Microcaecilia unicolor	Microcaecilia Unicolor	caecilians	353	XP_030048238.1	184	37.6	50.80%
Bufo gargarizans	Asiatic Toad	anura	353	XP_044143156.1	172	36.8	53.80%
Xenopus tropicalis	Western Clawed Frog	anura	353	XP_004910840.1	183	35.8	55.10%
Chanos chanos	Milkfish	gonorynchiformes	431	XP_030620693.1	168	32.8	47.00%
Pangasianodon hypophthalmus	Iridescent Shark	shark	431	XP_026784303.1	178	29.6	44.70%
Oncorhynchus mykiss	Rainbow Trout	salmoniformes	431	XP_021477694.1	186	29.4	43.80%
Amphiprion ocellaris	Ocellaris Clownfish	perciformes	431	XP_023154880.1	174	28.6	42.30%
Electrophorus electricus	Electric Eel	gymnotiformes	431	XP_026870189.2	209	25.7	40.50%
Larimichthys crocea	Yellow Croaker	acanthuriformes	431	TMS03948.1	171	23.2	37.40%

=== Clinical relevance ===
TMEM252 was found to be one of six novel genes associated with the prognosis of triple-negative breast cancer. Patients who had one or more of the six novel genes had significantly lower survival rates than those without. There are no relevant studies for TMEM252 and its relation to tumors.
