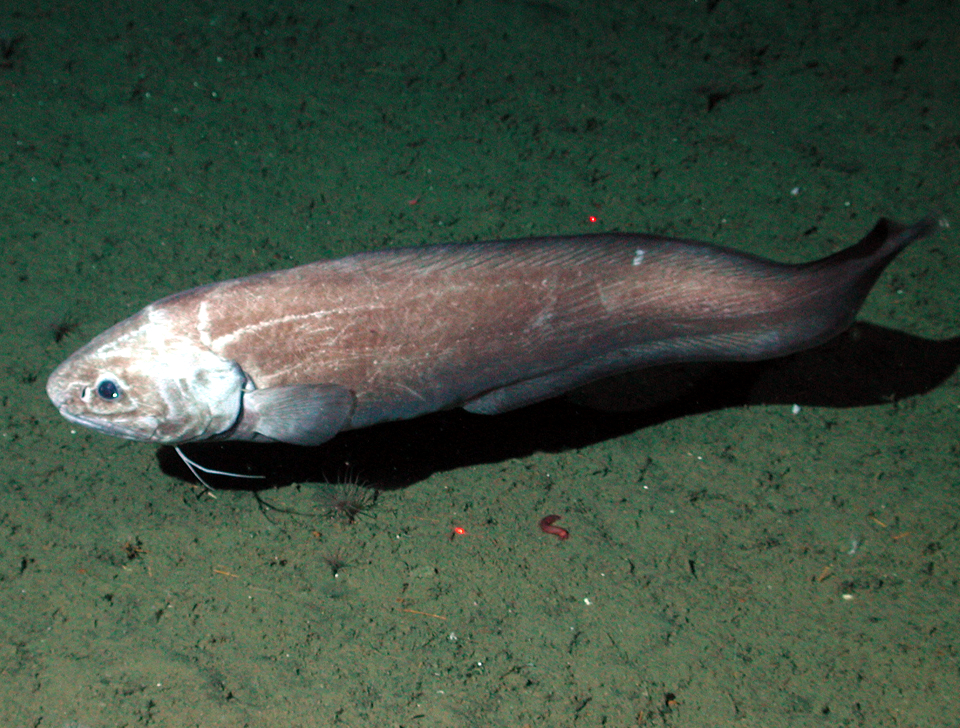

Conservation status
- Least Concern (IUCN 3.1)

Scientific classification
- Kingdom: Animalia
- Phylum: Chordata
- Class: Actinopterygii
- Order: Ophidiiformes
- Family: Ophidiidae
- Genus: Spectrunculus
- Species: S. grandis

Binomial name
- Spectrunculus grandis (Günther, 1877)

Synonyms
- Spectrunculus grandis (Günther, 1877); Sirembo grandis Günther, 1877; Bassogigas grandis (Günther, 1877); Neobythites grandis (Günther, 1877); Spectrunculus radcliffei Jordan & W.F. Thompson, 1914

= Spectrunculus grandis =

Species of fish

Spectrunculus grandis is a species of Rhizopharyngia ray-finned fish in the cusk-eel family known by the common names pudgy cusk-eel and giant cusk-eel. It is one of two species in the formerly monotypic genus Spectrunculus, the other species, S. crassus, having been differentiated in 2008.

The pudgy cusk-eel is a common fish of deep oceans worldwide. It is bathydemersal, living along the ocean floor most often at depths between 2,000 and 3,000 metres (6,560 and 9,840 ft), and known from waters as deep as 4,800 metres (15,750 ft). It is one of the largest bony fishes living below 2,000 metres (6,600 ft), reaching up to 127 centimetres (50 in) in length, and 5.4 kg (11 lb 14 oz) in weight. The male is larger than the female and darker in colour. It has a long, laterally compressed body and a rounded snout with a single fleshy anterior nostril in front of a flat posterior nostril. The fish varies in coloration from pale with white fins to light brown to dark brown; individuals from the Atlantic Ocean are often pale while Pacific Ocean specimens are usually darker.

The fish is oviparous, the eggs floating in masses.
