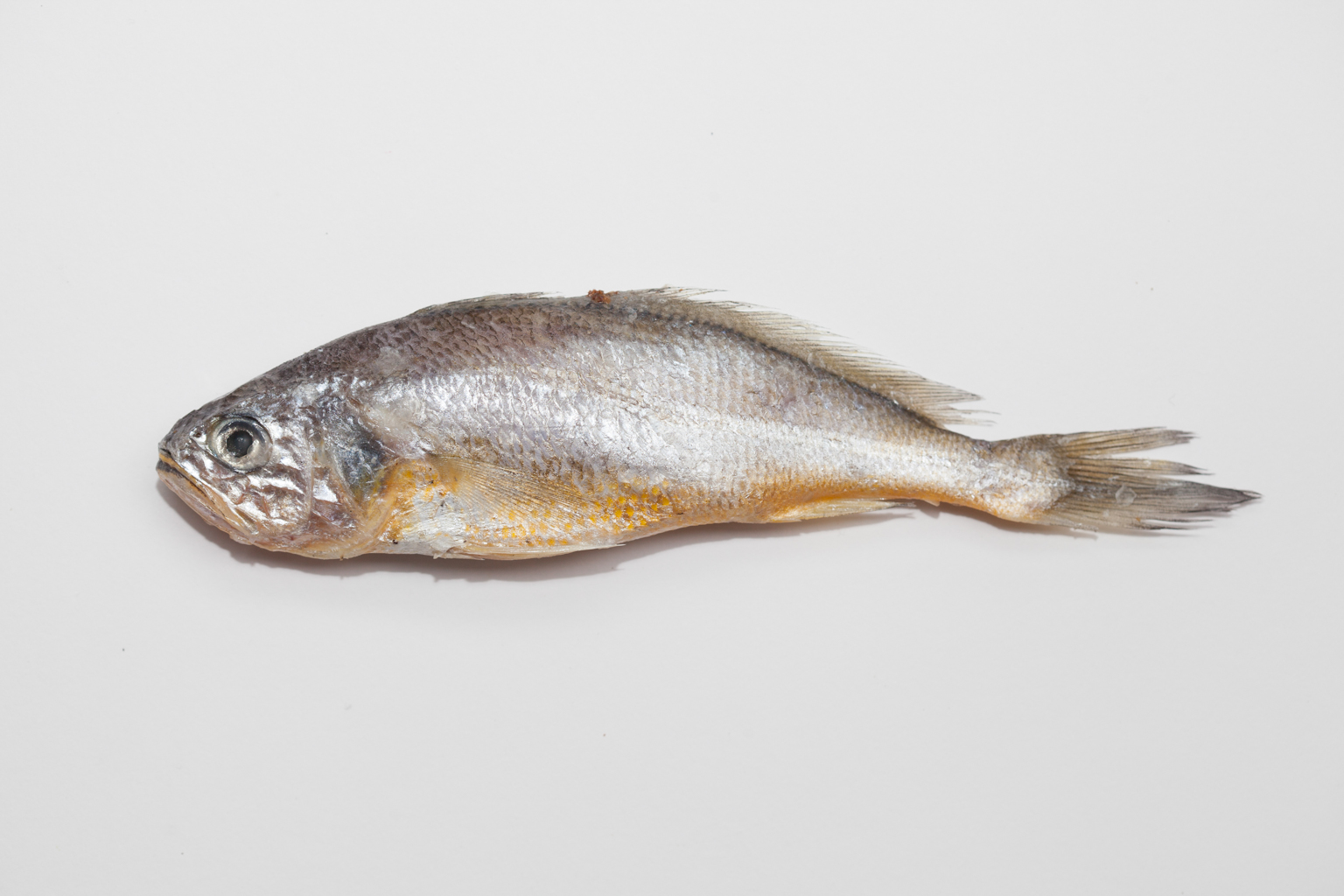

Scientific classification
- Kingdom: Animalia
- Phylum: Chordata
- Class: Actinopterygii
- Order: Acanthuriformes
- Family: Sciaenidae
- Genus: Larimichthys
- Species: L. polyactis

Binomial name
- Larimichthys polyactis (Bleeker, 1877)

Synonyms
- List: Pseudosciaena polyactis Bleeker, 1877; Argyrosomus polyactis (Bleeker, 1877); Collichthys polyactis (Bleeker, 1877); Larimichthys rathbunae Jordan & Starks, 1905; Collichthys rathbunae (Jordan & Starks, 1905); Sciaena manchurica Jordan & W. F. Thompson, 1911; Pseudosciaena manchurica (Jordan & Thompson, 1911); Sciaena ogiwara Nichols, 1913; Othonias brevirostris Wang, 1935

= Larimichthys polyactis =

Species of fish

Larimichthys polyactis, called the redlip croaker, small yellow croaker, little yellow croaker or yellow corvina, is a species of croaker native to the western Pacific, generally in temperate waters such as the East China Sea and the Yellow Sea.

== Evolution ==
Phylogenomic studies indicate this species emerged from the same common ancestor of L. crocea around 25.4 million years ago.

== Diet ==
They are benthopelagic feeders that usually eat shrimp, zooplankton, or sometimes small fishes.

== Habitat ==
They remain in shallow waters above 120 m, but avoid brackish conditions. They are typically found where the sea floor is sand or mud.

== Morphology ==
Males can reach 42 cm while the common length is about 30 cm. Their body shape is almost rectangular. They have red lips, grey gold body, gold belly and light yellow fins. The inside of its mouth is white and the gill slit is black. In its head are two hard, pale, white bones that keep balance when they swim, which is also used as a material for medicine. They can make noise by moving their air bladder in order not to scatter.

== Behavior ==
They have a habit of leaping above the sea. In winter, they move to warm water. The breeding season is from March to June. Usually they spawn 30,000 to 70,000 eggs.

== Relation to humans ==
Global capture production of Yellow croaker (Larimichthys polyactis) in thousand tonnes from 1950 to 2022, as reported by the FAO

Once an abundant commercial fish off the coasts of China, Korea and Japan, its population collapsed in the 1970s due to overfishing. Global catch later rebounded, with 388,018 t landed in 2008. Salted and dried, they are a food product known as gulbi (굴비) in Korean. Yeonggwang gulbi is a prized delicacy, selling for over $100 a bunch.

== Gallery ==
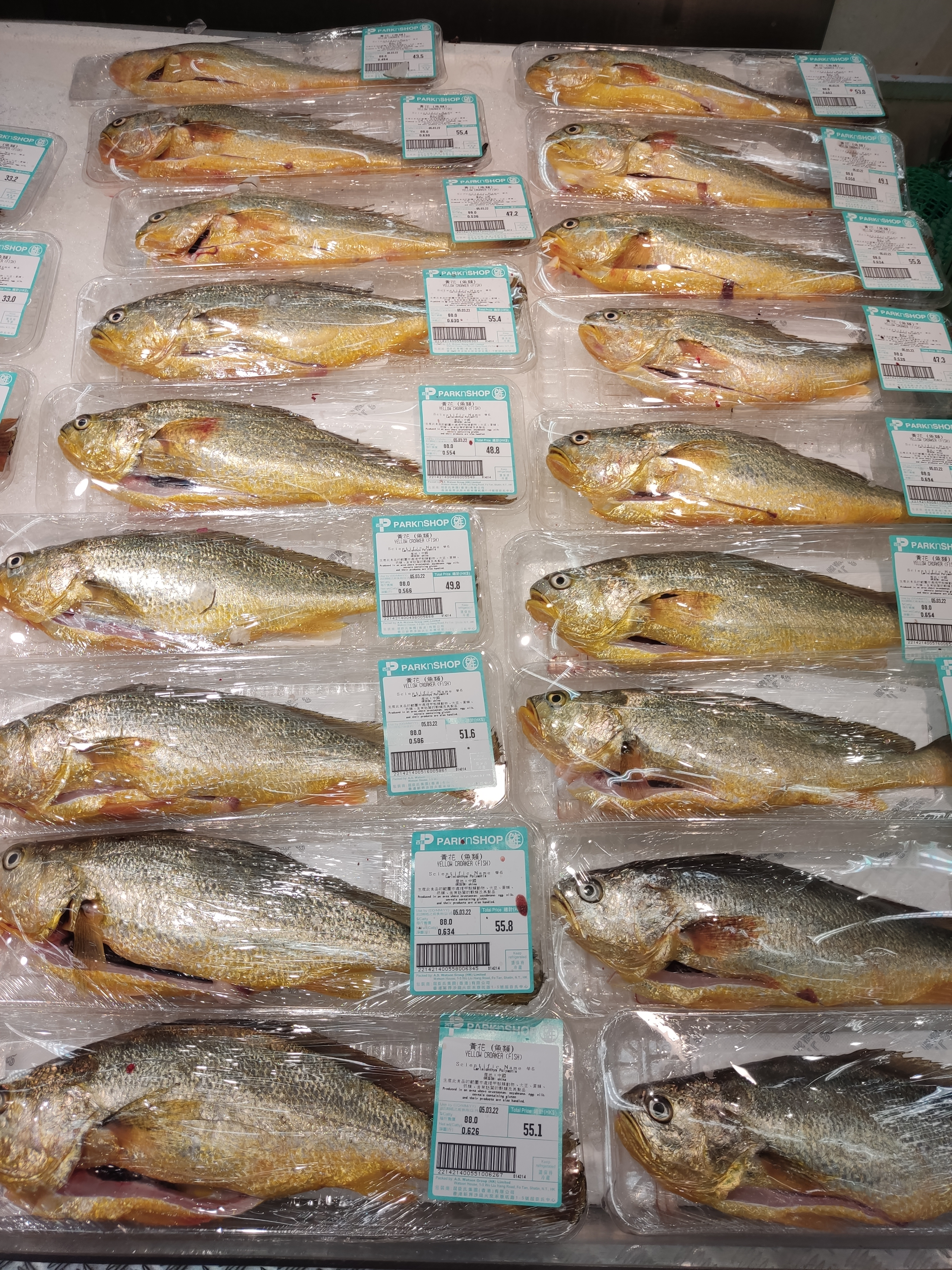
Sold in Hong Kong

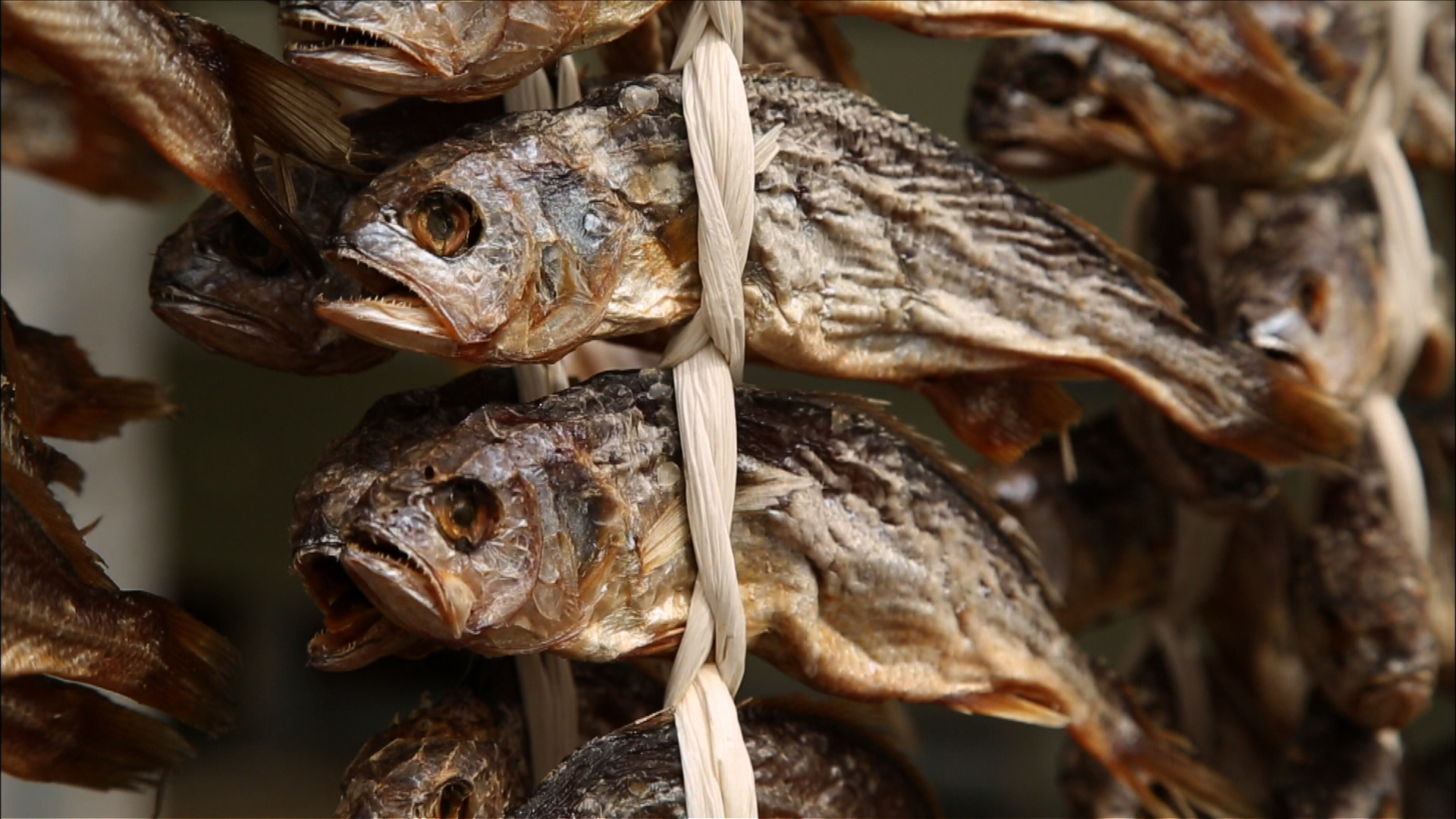
Korean gulbi

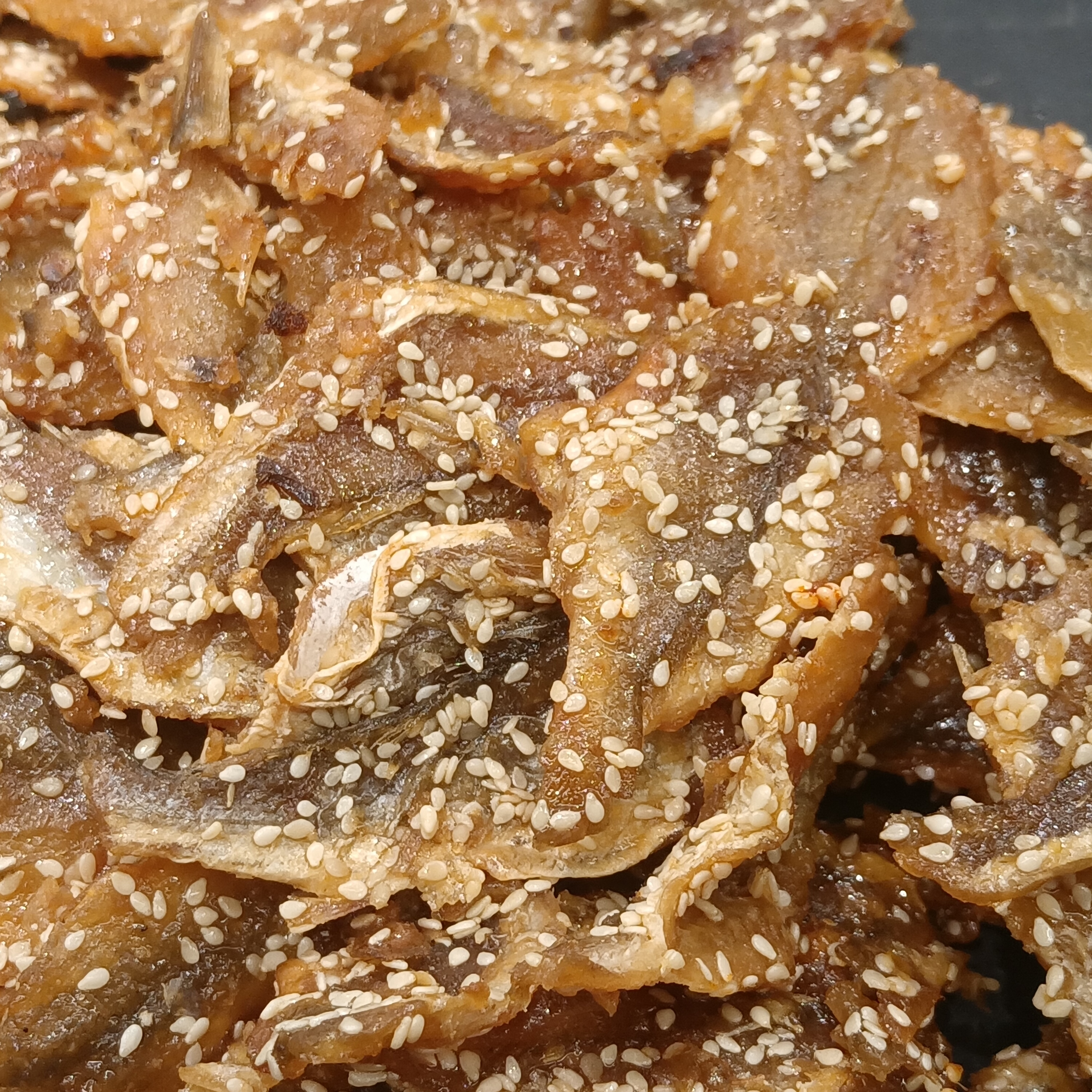

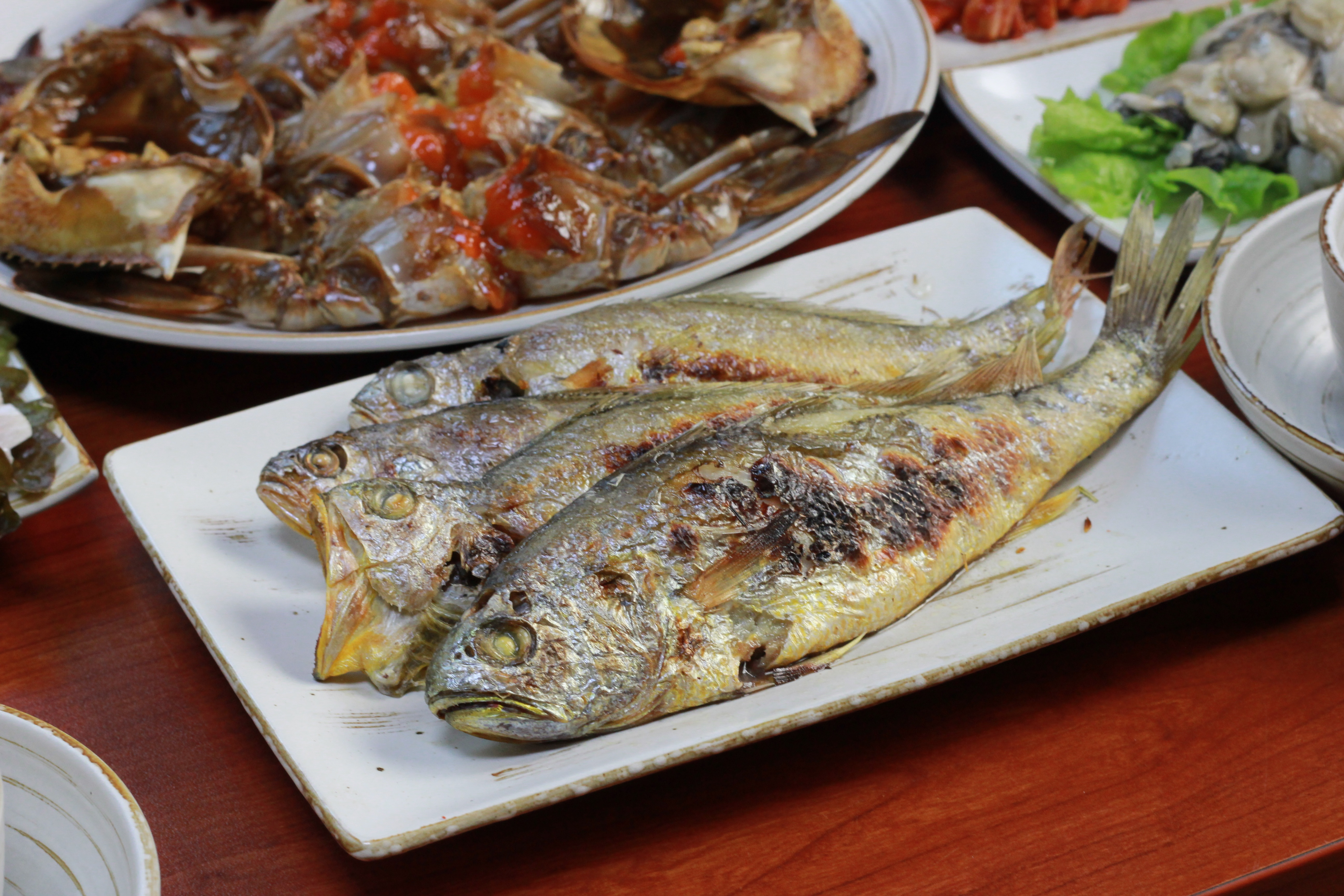

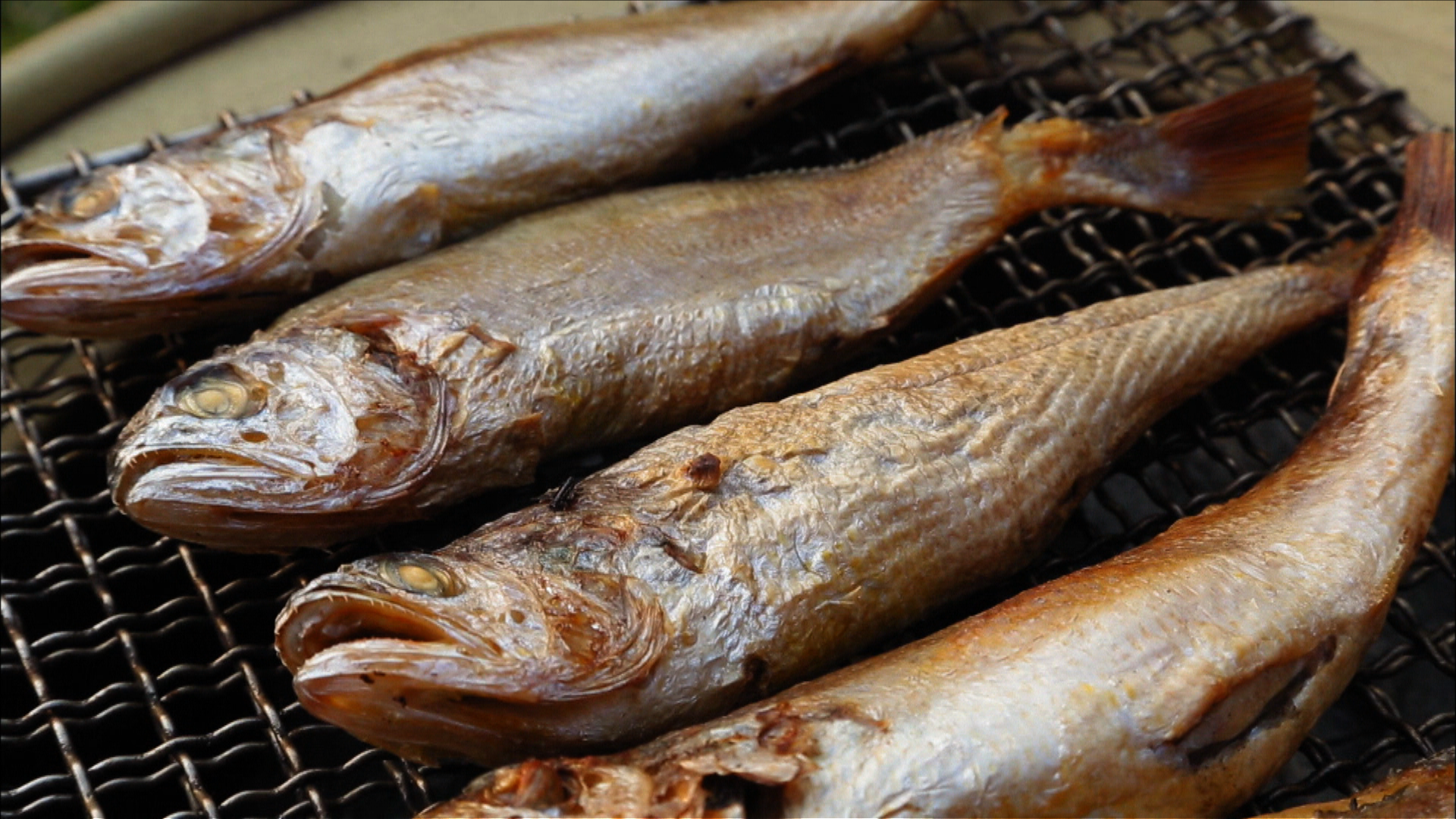
