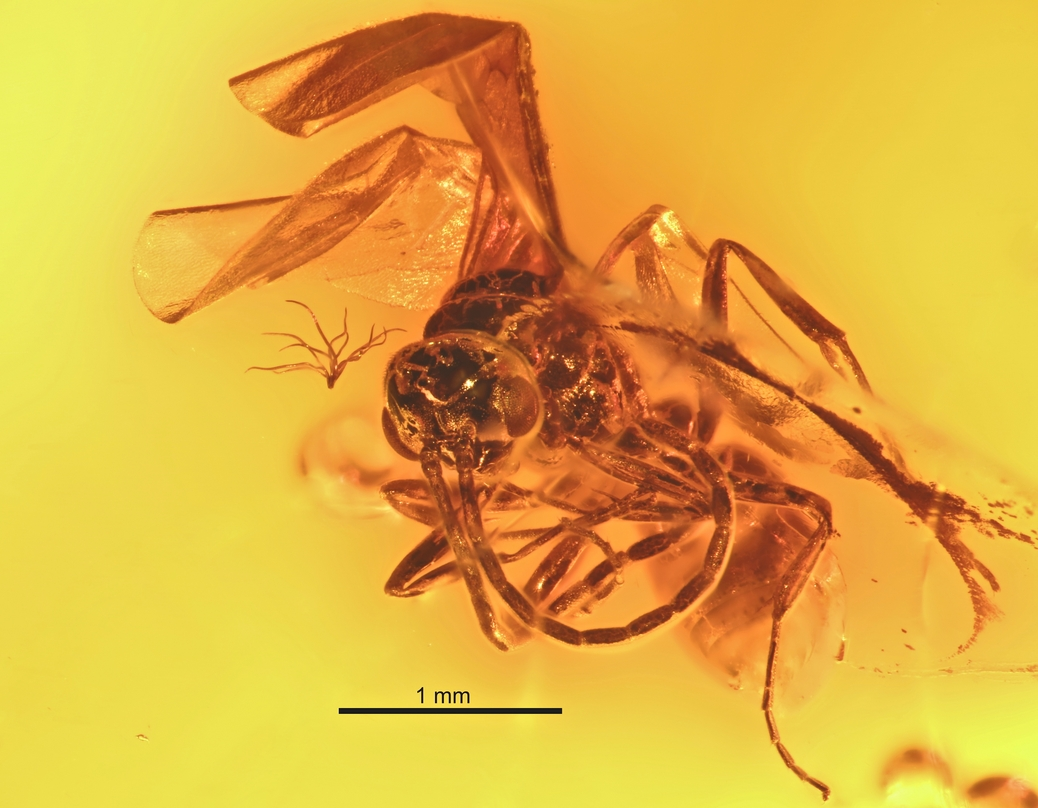
- P. succinea male

Scientific classification
- Domain: Eukaryota
- Kingdom: Animalia
- Phylum: Arthropoda
- Class: Insecta
- Order: Hymenoptera
- Family: Formicidae
- Genus: Pachycondyla
- Species: †P. succinea

Binomial name
- †Pachycondyla succinea (Mayr, 1868)

Synonyms
- Ponera succinea; Euponera (Trachymesopus) succinea

= Pachycondyla succinea =

Pachycondyla succinea Temporal range: Middle Eocene

Extinct species of ant

Pachycondyla succinea is an extinct species of ant in the formicid subfamily Ponerinae described from fossils found in Europe. P. petrosa is one of three middle Eocene Pachycondyla species found in Baltic amber.

== History and classification ==
When described Pachycondyla succinea was known only from three queen fossils which were fossilized as inclusions in transparent chunks of Baltic amber which are now presumed lost. Additional queens have since been found in Baltic, Rovno, and Scandinavian amber. Males were later identified from Baltic and Bitterfeld ambers.

Baltic amber is approximately forty six million years old, having been deposited during Lutetian stage of the Middle Eocene. There is debate on what plant family the amber was produced by, with macrofossil and microfossil evidence suggesting a Pinus relative, while chemical and spectroscopic evidence suggests Agathis or Sciadopitys. The paleoenvironment of the Eocene Baltic forests where the P. eocenicum lived was that of humid temperate to subtropical islands. The forests were composed of mostly Quercus and Pinus species, while the lower sections of the forests had paratropical plant elements, such as palms. Rovno amber, recovered from deposits in the Rivne region of Ukraine, is slightly younger in age, being dated to the Bartonian to Priabonian of the Late Eocene. Bitterfeld amber is recovered from coal deposits in the Saxony area of Germany and the dating of the deposits is uncertain. Bitterfeld represents a section of the Eocene Paratethys Sea, and the amber that is recovered from the region is thought to be redeposited from older sediments. The fossil record of Bitterfeld and Baltic amber insects is very similar with a number of shared species, and that similarity is noted in the suggestions of a single source for the paleoforest that produced the amber. The amber deposits on the Danish coast, often referred to as Scandinavian amber, is of similar age to the other three European ambers, however a study of the ant fauna published in 2009 indicates Scandinavian amber has a fairly distinct ant assemblage.

The species was first described in 1868 by Austrian entomologist Gustav Mayr based on three queens. He named the species and placed it into the genus Ponera as Ponera succinea. The species was redescribed in 1915 by William Morton Wheeler based on a group of 21 queens, including one of Mayrs three original syntypes. Based on the queens examined, Wheeler moved the species to the genus Euponera as Euponera (Trachymesopus) succinea. The placement was unchanged until 1995 when Euponera was synonymized with Pachycondyla by Barry Bolton. Pachycondyla was split into a number of genera in 2014 with most of the extant species being placed into other genera, but a series of fossil species including P. succinea were not moved. Schmidt and Shattuck in the revision of the genus noted that many of the fossil species were not moved due to specimens not being examined by them, and that the placement of the species was "undoubtedly incorrect". Males of the species were first formally described in 2009, based on specimens preserved in Baltic and Bitterfeld ambers.

P. succinea is one of three Pachycondyla species described from Baltic amber, the other two being P. baltica and P. gracillicornis. In addition to these species, one species is known from Rovno amber, P. conservata, and one species is known from Bitterfeld amber, P. tristis.

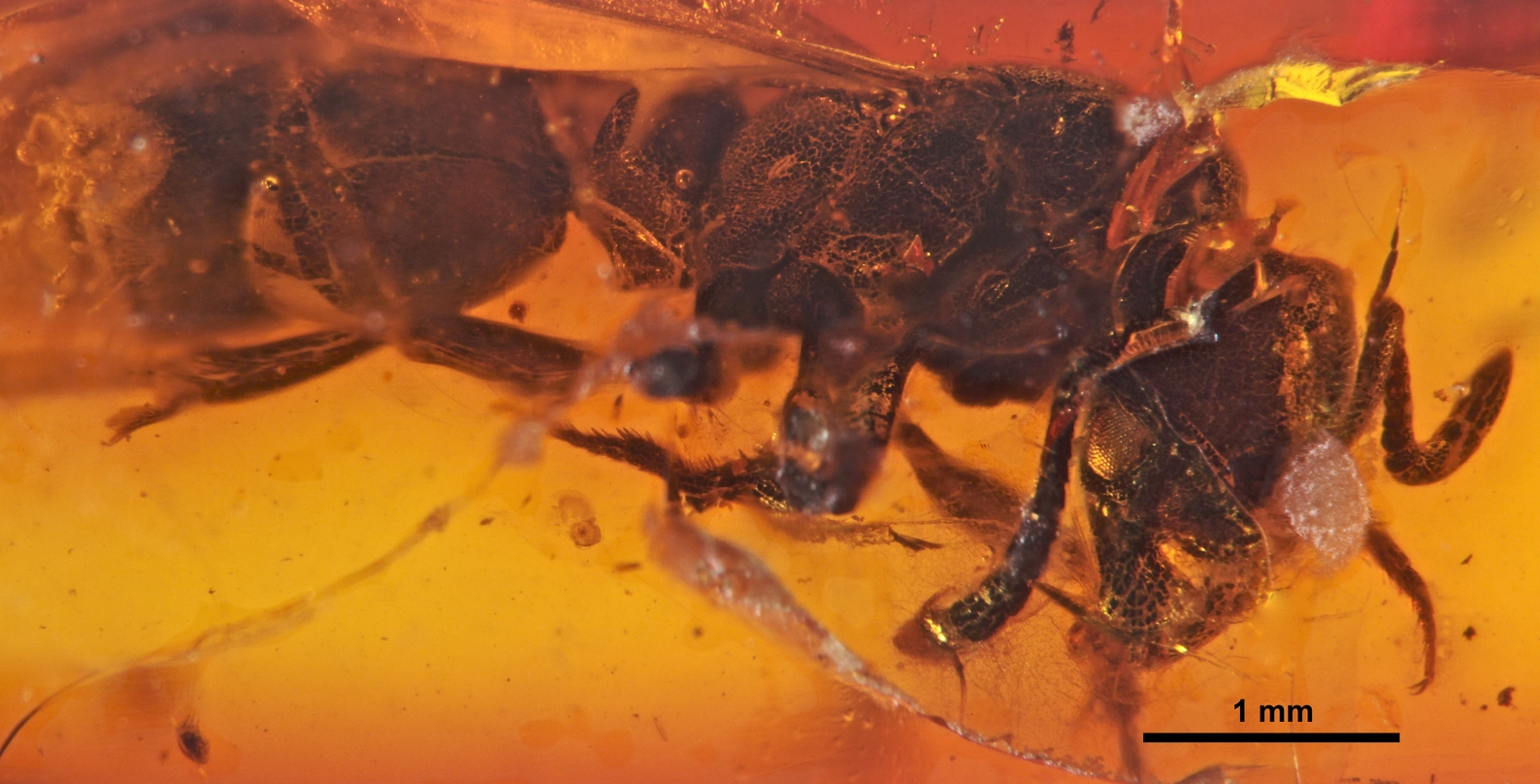
Neotype queen

== Description ==
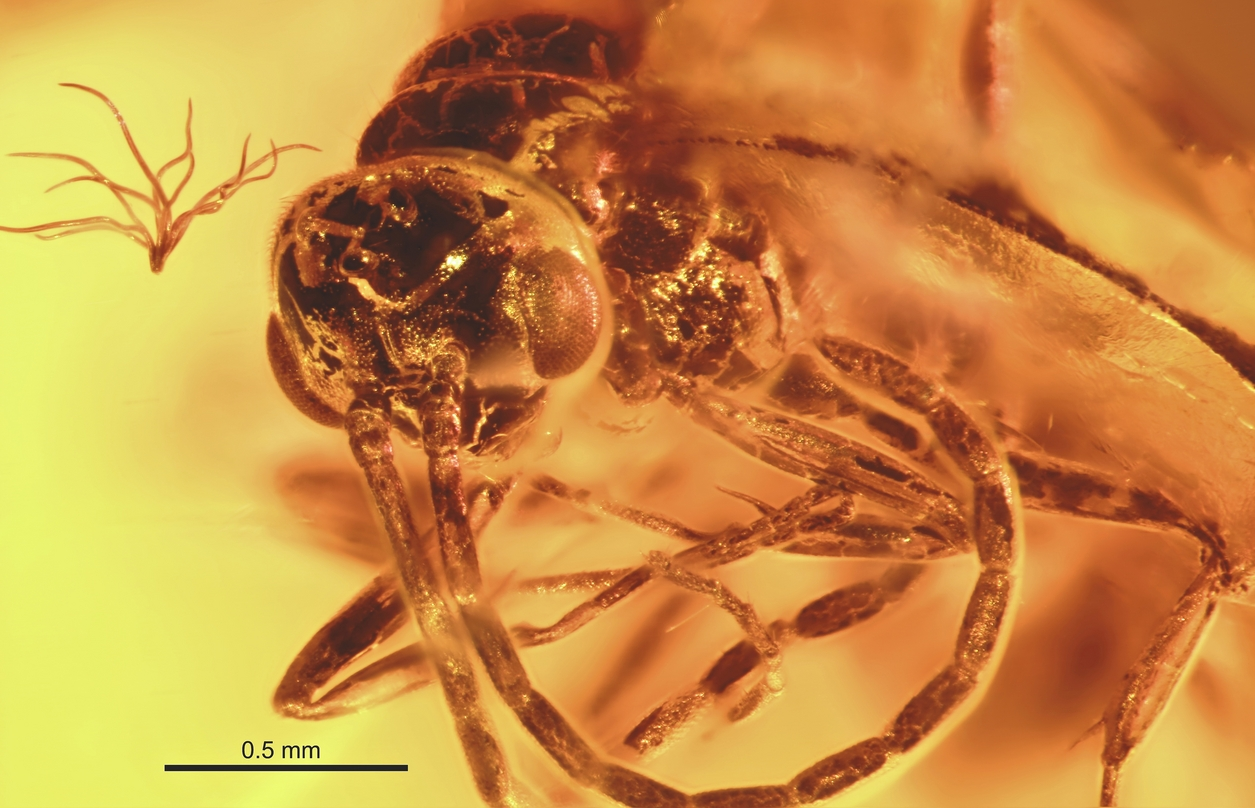
Closeup of male head

The queens have a body length of 4–6 mm (0.16–0.24 in), with dense pitting along all of the body excluding the gaster, which is smooth. There are hairs spread evenly over the body with a mix of decumbent, erect, and partially erect hairs. The flat laying and partially erect hairs of the gaster are longer than the space between adjacent hairs. The head is rectangular in outline with distinctly developed rear corners, a concave rear margin, and small distinct ocelli. The compound eyes, slightly bulged out with oval outlines, are placed far forward on the head, shortening the gena to shorter than the eye diameter. The antennae are composed of 12 segments, with the basal and tip segments longer than wide, while the rest are shorter than wide. The bottom most segment, the scape, is longer than the other antenna segments, but does not reach the rear edge of the head. There are six teeth on the chewing face of the mandibles, and no external tooth on the outer margin.

The males are smaller than the queens, with a total body length between 3.5–4.5 mm (0.14–0.18 in) and an overall shiny exoskeleton. There are longitudinal ridges on the propodeum sides, while the petiole is smooth. There is dense pitting on the head and sparser pitting is present on the gaster and mesosoma. Many upright hairs are found on the gaster, petiole scale, upper surface of the mesosoma, and on the head. Decumbent hairs are present over the whole exoskeleton, showing most distinctly on the gaster, where the hairs are "several times" longer than that of the spacing between each hair. The head is rounded in outline, with a convex rear edge and no distinct rear corners, but instead has a slight expansion of the anterior section and no frontal ridges are present. The eyes are kidney shaped, slightly bulging, and large, placed far forward on the head. The ocelli are also large, but smaller than the distance between each of the three.
