= Yara Haridy =

Egyptian-Canadian paleontologist

Yara Haridy is an Egyptian-Canadian paleontologist and scientific communicator who specializes in the use of advanced analytical methods to study the evolution of bone and related skeletal tissues.

== Biography ==
Haridy was born in Morocco and lived in Egypt until her family moved to Canada when she was 12 years old. She obtained her B.Sc. in biology from the University of Toronto in 2016, where she originally intended to pursue the pre-medicine track en route to a medical career, followed by her M.Sc. in Ecology and Evolutionary Biology obtained from the University of Toronto in 2018, where she studied the evolution of acrodonty in reptiles. She obtained her Ph.D. from Humboldt University of Berlin and the Museum für Naturkunde Berlin under the supervision of Florian Witzmann and Nadia Fröbisch in 2021.

== Academic contributions ==
Haridy's research primarily focuses on the evolution of bone and other skeletal tissues. She has extensive experience studying the evolution of different forms of dentition and tooth replacement, primarily in extinct and extant reptiles, as well as paleopathologies. Her research methods include bone histology, computed tomography (CT), and focused ion beam scanning electron microscopy (FIB-SEM). Some of her most notable work includes the identification of the earliest occurrence of a viral-induced metabolic disease (Paget's disease), the earliest occurrence of bone cancer (osteosarcoma) in an amniote (in the stem turtle Pappochelys), and the morphological characterization of osteocytes in early fish that could be linked to physiological advantages of osteocytes that led to the modern-day prevalence of osteocytic bone among vertebrates. Her work has been published in several leading international scientific journals, including Biology Letters, Scientific Reports, Systematic Biology, Science Advances, and JAMA Oncology, with over 140 citations to date, and has received extensive media coverage, including from international outlets such as National Geographic, the New York Times, the Smithsonian Magazine, Science Magazine, the Toronto Star, and Newsweek.

== Outreach and scientific communication ==
Haridy is an active scientific communicator who engages primarily through Twitter, where she has more than 21,000 followers and has created several viral hashtags related to her research, including #GuessTheSkull and #SerialKillerOrScientist, which have drawn media coverage. Among her ongoing projects is the development of a Velociraptor puppet through a Palaeontological Association Engagement Grant. She has been featured on a number of popular podcasts, including See Jurassic Right, The Purrrcast, and NPR's Short Wave and is active in public outreach events, including Soapbox Science and Skype a Scientist. She is also a vocal advocate for improving equity in international scientific research through increased local collaboration and support of development of natural history infrastructure in non-western countries.
