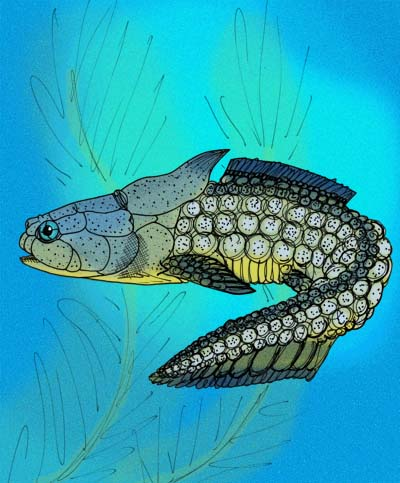
- Artist's reconstruction

Scientific classification
- Domain: Eukaryota
- Kingdom: Animalia
- Phylum: Chordata
- Class: †Placodermi
- Order: †Acanthothoraci
- Family: †Palaeacanthaspidae
- Genus: †Palaeacanthaspis; Brotzen, 1934
- Species: †P. vasta

Binomial name
- †Palaeacanthaspis vasta Brotzen, 1934

= Palaeacanthaspis =

Palaeacanthaspis Temporal range: Early Devonian

Extinct genus of fishes

Palaeacanthaspis vasta is an extinct acanthothoracid placoderm from the early Devonian of Europe.
