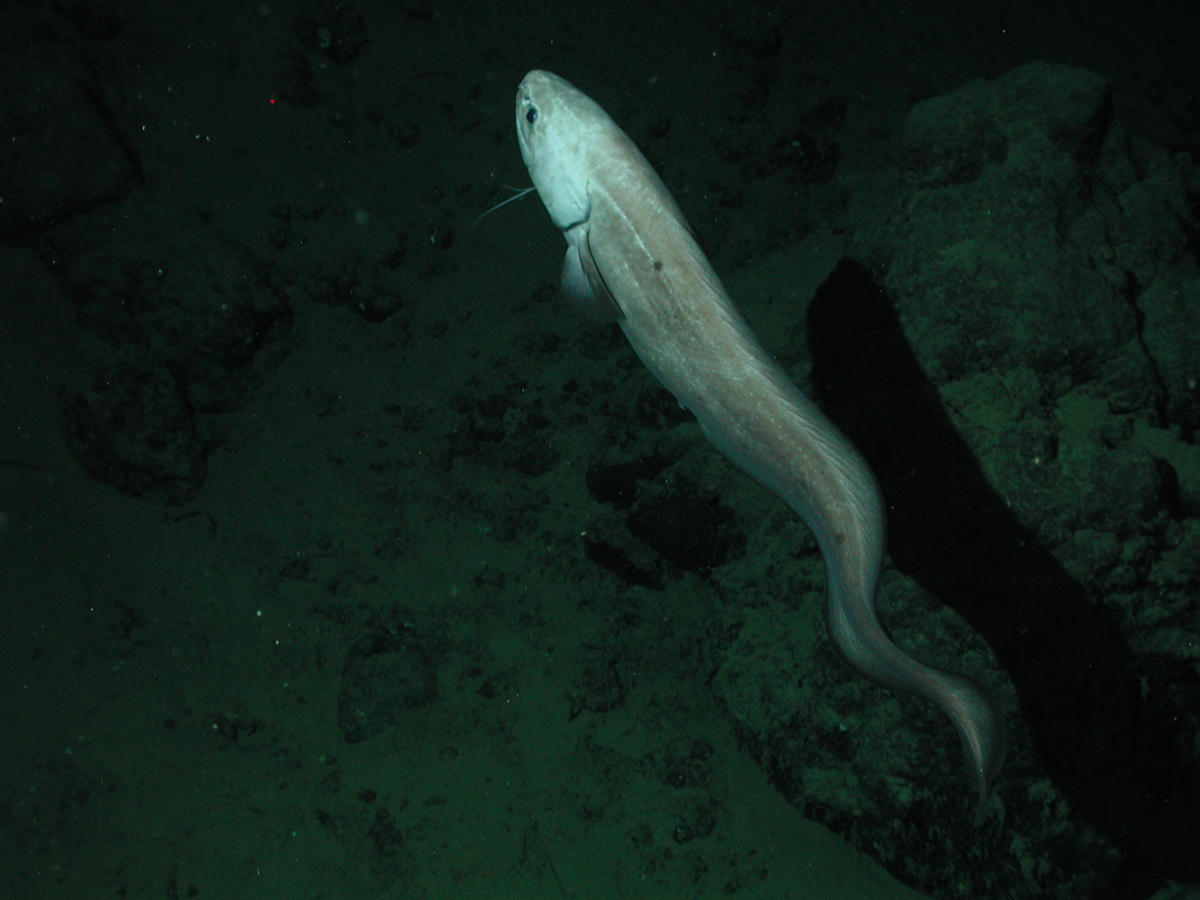
- Pudgy Cusk-eel (S. grandis)

Scientific classification
- Kingdom: Animalia
- Phylum: Chordata
- Class: Actinopterygii
- Order: Ophidiiformes
- Family: Ophidiidae
- Subfamily: Neobythitinae
- Genus: Spectrunculus; D. S. Jordan & W. F. Thompson, 1914

Type species
- Spectrunculus radcliffei Jordan & Thompson, 1914

= Spectrunculus =

Genus of fishes

Spectrunculus is a genus of cusk-eels found in the Atlantic and Pacific Oceans.

== Species ==
There are currently two recognized species in this genus:

- Spectrunculus crassus (Vaillant, 1888)
- Spectrunculus grandis (Günther, 1877) (Pudgy cusk-eel)
