= Kelliaichthys =

Kelliaichthys Temporal range: Early Permian (Asselian)

Scientific classification
- Kingdom: Animalia
- Phylum: Chordata
- Class: Actinopterygii
- Genus: †Kelliaichthys; Schultze, 2021
- Species: †K. velox

Binomial name
- †Kelliaichthys velox (Kazantseva-Selezneva, 1980)

Synonyms
- †Kellia velox Kazantseva-Selezneva, 1980

Extinct genus of fishes

Kelliaichthys is an extinct genus of prehistoric marine "palaeoniscoid" ray-finned fish that lived during the Cisuralian (early Permian) epoch in what is now East Kazakhstan, Kazakhstan. It was originally named "Kellia" by Kazantseva-Selezneva (1980). Because this genus name was already given to an extant lasaeid bivalve (Kellia Turton, 1822), the new name Kelliaichthys was erected for the Permian fish. The genus includes a single species (monotypy): Kelliaichthys velox.

== See also ==
- Prehistoric fish
- List of prehistoric bony fish
