= Spectrunculus crassus =

Conservation status
- Least Concern (IUCN 3.1)

Scientific classification
- Kingdom: Animalia
- Phylum: Chordata
- Class: Actinopterygii
- Order: Ophidiiformes
- Family: Ophidiidae
- Genus: Spectrunculus
- Species: S. crassus

Binomial name
- Spectrunculus crassus (Vaillant, 1888)

Synonyms
- Bassogigas coheni Mayer & Nalbant, 1972; Bythites crassus Vaillant, 1888; Spectrunculus coheni (Mayer & Nalbant, 1972)

Species of Actinopterygii

Spectrunculus crassus is a species of cusk-eel native to the Atlantic and eastern Pacific.
