= Mcmurdodus =

Mcmurdodus Temporal range: Eifelian–Givetian

Scientific classification
- Kingdom: Animalia
- Phylum: Chordata
- Class: Chondrichthyes
- Subclass: Elasmobranchii
- Family: †Mcmurdodontidae
- Genus: †Mcmurdodus; White, 1968
- Species: †M. featherensis

Binomial name
- †Mcmurdodus featherensis White, 1968

Extinct genus of cartilaginous fishes

Mcmurdodus is an extinct genus of chondrichthyan belonging to the family Mcmurdodontidae. It contains one species, Mcmurdodus featherensis, from the Middle Devonian of Antarctica. The Australian species M. whitei was previously included in the genus too, but was moved to a new genus, Maiseyodus, in 2021.

Their teeth closely resemble those of modern sharks in the families Hexanchidae and Echinorhinidae, and they were tentatively classified in the Hexanchiformes when first described. However, more recent analyses indicate that they lack multiple layers of enameloid on their tooth crowns, something present in all modern sharks and many sharks that coexisted with Mcmurdodus. In addition, most divergence estimates for modern sharks are irreconcilable with the age of Mcmurdodus. For this reason, the Mcmurdontidae are now considered indeterminate chondrichthyans.
