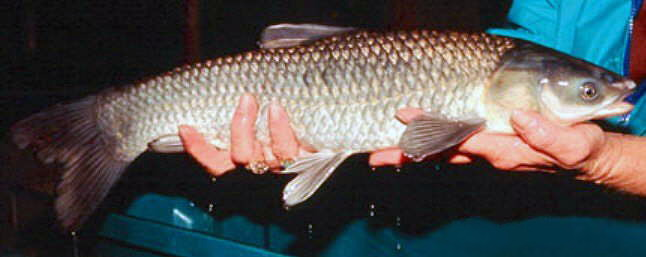
- Mylopharyngodon piceus

Scientific classification
- Kingdom: Animalia
- Phylum: Chordata
- Class: Actinopterygii
- Order: Cypriniformes
- Family: Cyprinidae
- Subfamily: Squaliobarbinae; Howes, 1981

= Squaliobarbinae =

Subfamily of fishes

Squaliobarbinae is a small subfamily of the carp and minnow family, Cyprinidae, which consists of three monotypic genera which have their natural distributions in eastern Asia. Two species, the grass carp (Ctenopharyngodon idella) and the black carp (Mylopharyngodon piceus), have been introduced to other parts of the world for weed control and aquaculture. They are large cyprinids characterised by an enlarged subtemporal fossa, the palate articulating with the supraethmoid, an enlarged intercalar bone in the cranial vault, and a divided levator posterior muscle.

== Genera ==
The three genera that make up the subfamily Squaliobarbinae are:

Image	Genus	Living species
	Ctenopharyngodon Steindachner, 1866	Grass carp,Ctenopharyngodon idella
	Mylopharyngodon Peters, 1881	Black carp, Mylopharyngodon piceus
	Squaliobarbus Günther, 1868	Barbel chub, Squaliobarbus curriculus

== Taxonomy ==
Cyprinids are a large, widespread, and diverse family of mainly freshwater ray-finned fishes, and the taxonomy of the family has not yet been fully resolved. Fishbase recognises the Squaliobarbinae as a valid subfamily, but recent studies suggest that this may not necessarily be the case. For example, the three genera of this subfamily have been placed in the larger subfamily Oxygasterinae, and Squaliobarbinae is listed as a synonym of Oxygasterinae. and the World Register of Marine Species treats all three taxa traditionally placed in the Squaliobarbinae as incertae sedis. while the Catalog of Fishes places them in the subfamily Xenocyprinae. However, at whatever level they are classified the three squaliobarbine taxa appear to be closely related and to form a clade. and have been referred to as the tribe Squaliobarbini.
