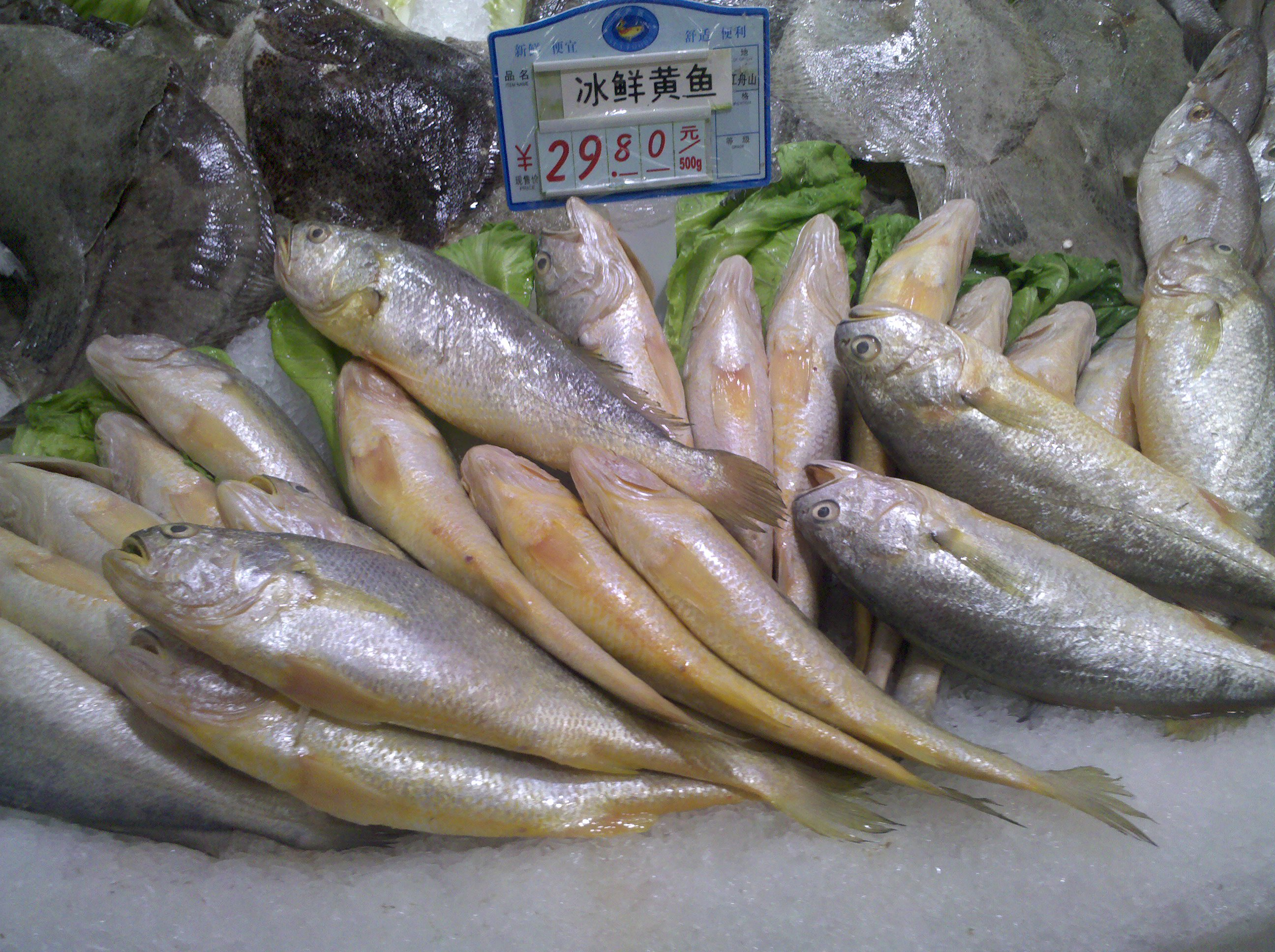
- Larimichthys polyactis

Scientific classification
- Kingdom: Animalia
- Phylum: Chordata
- Class: Actinopterygii
- Division: Teleostei
- Order: Acanthuriformes
- Family: Sciaenidae
- Genus: Larimichthys; D. S. Jordan & Starks, 1905

Type species
- Larimichthys rathbunae Jordan & Starks, 1905

Synonyms
- Othonias Jordan & W. F. Thompson, 1911

= Larimichthys =

Genus of fishes

Larimichthys is a genus of marine ray-finned fishes belonging to the drums and croakers family Sciaenidae. Commonly known as yellow croakers, these forage fish are found in the shallow marginal seas of the Western Pacific.

== Taxonomy ==
Larimichthys was first proposed as a monospecific genus in 1905 by the American ichthyologists David Starr Jordan and Edwin Chapin Starks when they described Larimichthys rathbunae from Korea. This genus has been placed in the subfamily Otolithinae by some workers, but the 5th edition of Fishes of the World does not recognise subfamilies within the Sciaenidae which it places in the order Acanthuriformes.

== Etymology ==
Larimichthys is a combination of Larimus, as this genus was considered to be closely related close to that genus but is different in the possession of cycloid scales, non-uniform teeth, weak spines in the anal fin and a more cavernous head, with ichthys, meaning "fish".

== Species ==
Larimichthys has 3 valid species classified within it:

- Larimichthys crocea (J. Richardson, 1846) (large yellow croaker)
- Larimichthys pamoides (Munro, 1964) (southern yellow croaker)
- Larimichthys polyactis (Bleeker, 1877) (small yellow croaker)

== Characteristics ==
Larimichthys croakers are distinguished from other genera of Sciaenids by the carrot-shaped swimbladder having horn-like or tube-like appendages which begin on either the headward or tailward part of the swim bladder. The first appendage, originating closest to the head, enters the head and branches between the skull and the upper gill arch. The swimbladder appendages have limbs on their upper and lower sides. The otolith has a slightly oblique head of its sulcus which also has a shallow tail. They do not have a barbel on the chin and the scales on the head and front part of the body are cycloid. They have between 33 and 36 soft rays on the dorsal fin. The largest species on the genus is L. crocea which has a maximum published total length of 80 cm (31 in) while the smallest is L. pamoides which has a maximum published total length of 13.5 cm (5.3 in).

== Fisheries ==
The genus includes major fishery species in the Northwest Pacific, principally by China: with a catch of 438 thousand tonnes in 2012, small yellow croaker Larimichthys polyactis is 24th among the 70 "principal" capture species, and also the annual catches of large yellow croaker Larimichthys crocea are significant at 70 thousand tonnes.
