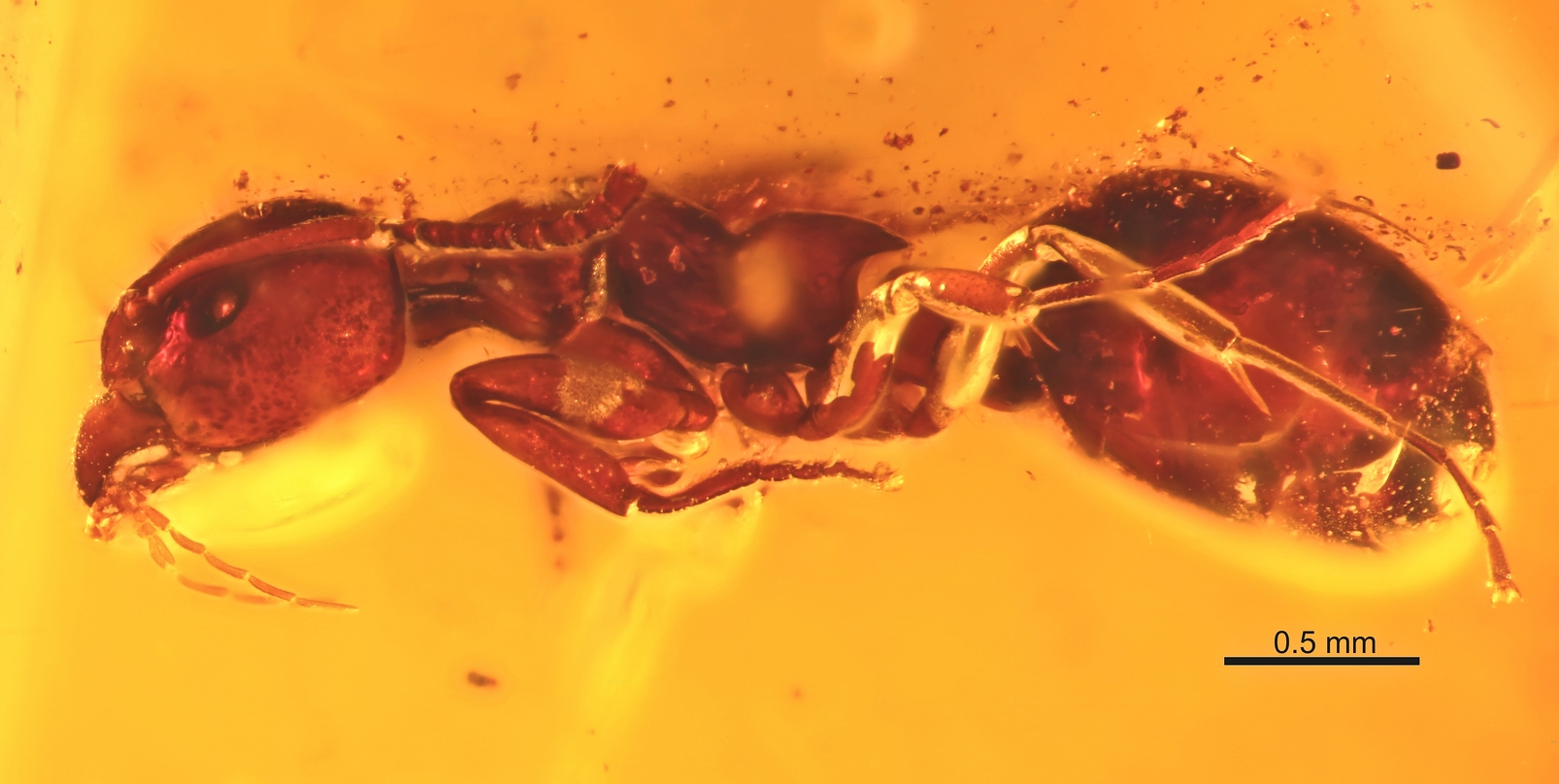
- Worker in Baltic amber

Scientific classification
- Domain: Eukaryota
- Kingdom: Animalia
- Phylum: Arthropoda
- Class: Insecta
- Order: Hymenoptera
- Family: Formicidae
- Subfamily: Dolichoderinae
- Genus: Dolichoderus
- Species: †D. tertiarius

Binomial name
- †Dolichoderus tertiarius (Mayr, 1868)

Synonyms
- Hypoclinea tertiaria

= Dolichoderus tertiarius =

Dolichoderus tertiarius Temporal range: Middle to Late Eocene

Species of ant

Dolichoderus tertiarius is an extinct species of Eocene ant in the genus Dolichoderus. Described by Mayr in 1868, fossils of a worker, queen and male were discovered and described in the Baltic amber.
