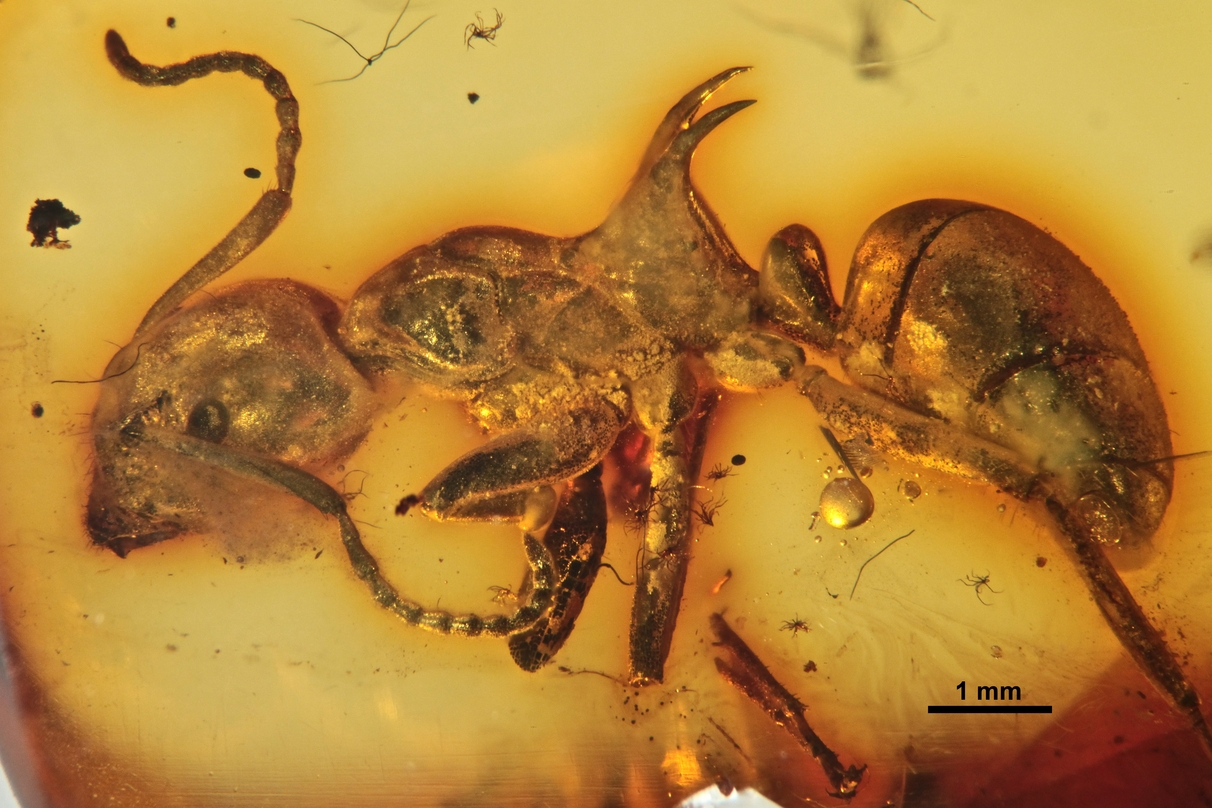
- Worker in Baltic amber

Scientific classification
- Domain: Eukaryota
- Kingdom: Animalia
- Phylum: Arthropoda
- Class: Insecta
- Order: Hymenoptera
- Family: Formicidae
- Subfamily: Dolichoderinae
- Genus: Dolichoderus
- Species: †D. cornutus

Binomial name
- †Dolichoderus cornutus (Mayr, 1868)

Synonyms
- Hypoclinea cornuta

= Dolichoderus cornutus =

Dolichoderus cornutus Temporal range: Middle to Late Eocene

Species of ant

Dolichoderus cornutus is an extinct species of Eocene ant in the genus Dolichoderus. Described by Mayr in 1868, the fossils were discovered in the Baltic amber, where a fossilised worker ant was only described, and it is presumed these ants existed at least 40 million years ago.
