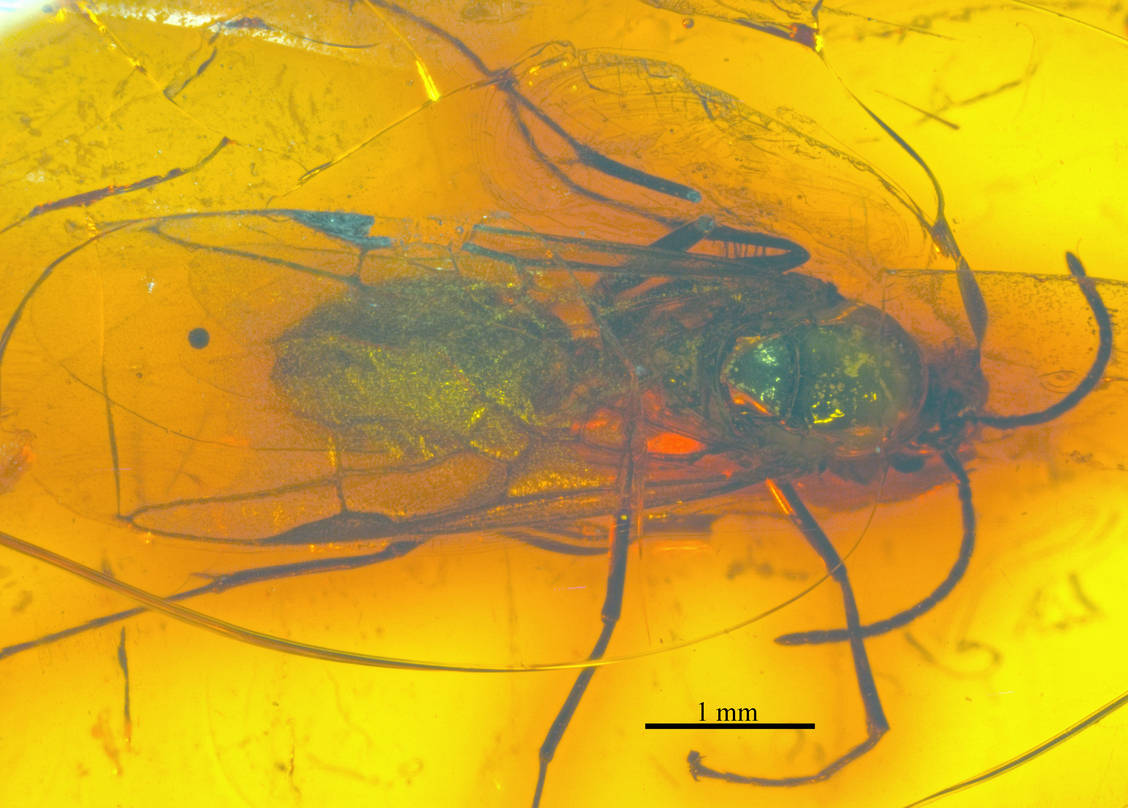
- Holotype queen in Baltic amber

Scientific classification
- Domain: Eukaryota
- Kingdom: Animalia
- Phylum: Arthropoda
- Class: Insecta
- Order: Hymenoptera
- Family: Formicidae
- Subfamily: Dolichoderinae
- Genus: Dolichoderus
- Species: †D. longipennis

Binomial name
- †Dolichoderus longipennis (Mayr, 1868)

Synonyms
- Hypoclinea longipennis

= Dolichoderus longipennis =

Dolichoderus longipennis Temporal range: Middle to Late Eocene

Species of ant

Dolichoderus longipennis is an extinct species of Eocene ant in the genus Dolichoderus. Described by Mayr in 1868, the fossils were discovered in the Baltic Amber.
