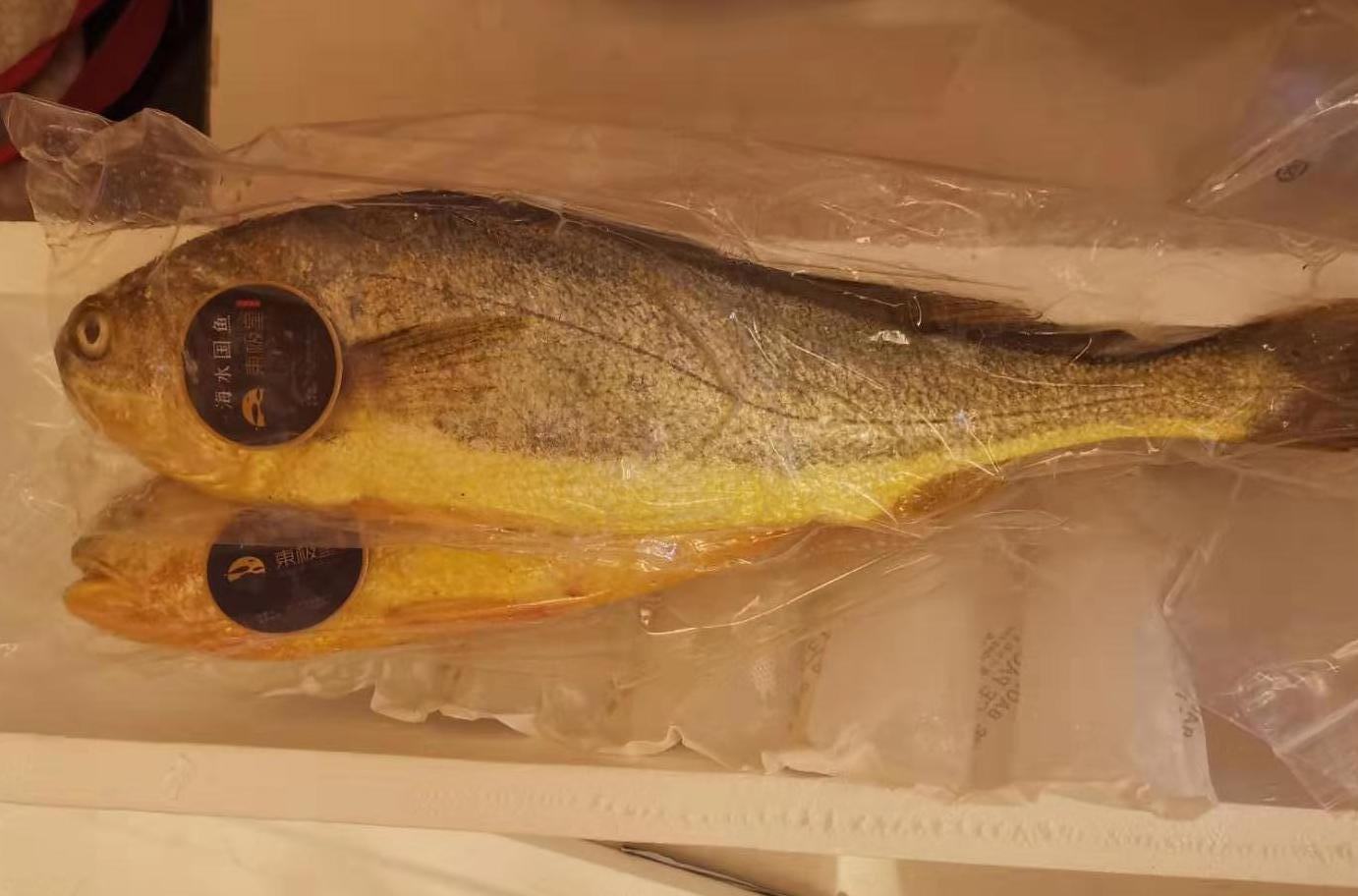

Conservation status
- Critically Endangered (IUCN 3.1)

Scientific classification
- Kingdom: Animalia
- Phylum: Chordata
- Class: Actinopterygii
- Division: Teleostei
- Order: Acanthuriformes
- Family: Sciaenidae
- Genus: Larimichthys
- Species: L. crocea

Binomial name
- Larimichthys crocea (Richardson, 1846)

Synonyms
- Sciaena crocea Richardson, 1846; Collichthys croceus (Richardson, 1846); Pseudosciaena crocea (Richardson, 1846); Pseudosciaena amblyceps Bleeker, 1863; Collichthys chinensis Steindachner, 1866; Pseudosciaena undovittata Jordan & Seale, 1905

= Larimichthys crocea =

Species of fish

Larimichthys crocea, commonly called the large yellow croaker, yellow croaker or croceine croaker, is a species of marine ray-finned fish belonging to the family Sciaenidae, the drums and croakers. This species is found in the Western Pacific Ocean.

== Taxonomy ==
Larimichthys crocea was first formally described as Sciaena crocea in 1846 by the Scottish naval surgeon, Arctic explorer and naturalist Sir John Richardson with its type locality given as "Canton, China". The genus Larimichthys, to which this species belongs, has been placed in the subfamily Otolithinae by some workers, but the 5th edition of Fishes of the World does not recognise subfamilies within the Sciaenidae which it places in the order Acanthuriformes. In 2011 specimens which were thought to be L. crocea were taken off Terengganu in eastern Peninsular Malaysia but these have now been classified as a separate valid species Larimichthys terengganui.

== Etymology ==
Larimichthys crocea has the specific name crocea which means "saffron" and is an allusion to yellow colours on the body and fins.

== Description ==
Larimichthys crocea has a dorsal fin which is supported by 9 or 10 spines and between 30 and 35 soft rays while the anal fin is supported by 2 spines and between 7 and 9, typically 8, soft rays. The soft rayed parts of these fins are largely covered in scales. The overall colour of fresh specimens is gold. This species reaches a maximum published total length of 80 cm (31 in).

== Distribution and habitat ==
Larimichthys crocea is found in the marginal seas of East Asia from western Japan and Korea to the Yellow Sea, East China Sea, Taiwan Strait and northern South China Sea. It generally thrives in temperate coastal waters and often also in brackish estuaries, and is found on muddy-sandy bottoms.

== Utilisation and conservation ==
Capture (blue) and aquaculture (green) production of Large yellow croaker (Larimichthys croceus) in thousand tonnes from 1950 to 2022, as reported by the FAO

Larimichthys crocea was once an abundant commercial fish off East and South China, Taiwan, South Korea and Japan, its population collapsed in the 1970s due to overfishing. Fishing boats landed 56,000 tonnes of Larimichthys crocea in 2008, and 91,000 tonnes in 2013. The species is now aquafarmed in China, and production has grown to 105,000 tonnes by 2013. Farms have experienced outbreaks of Nocardia seriolae infections.

The IUCN classifies this species as Critically Endangered as there has been no recovery in the population and there is no evidence that the fishery for this species is sustainable.

== Genome ==
Larimichthys crocea is an important enough commercial species to have its genome mapped in 2014. On 6 January 2015 it became the 200th organism to have its genome annotated by the NCBI Eukaryotic Genome Annotation Pipeline.

== Parasites ==
As all fish species, Larimichthys crocea is the host of many parasite species. A new species of trypanosome, Trypanosoma larimichthysi Yang et al., 2025, was described in 2025 from fish collected in Fujian Province, China. The trypanosome infection had no effect on the growth, but induced pathological changes in the gills, liver, spleen and kidney.
