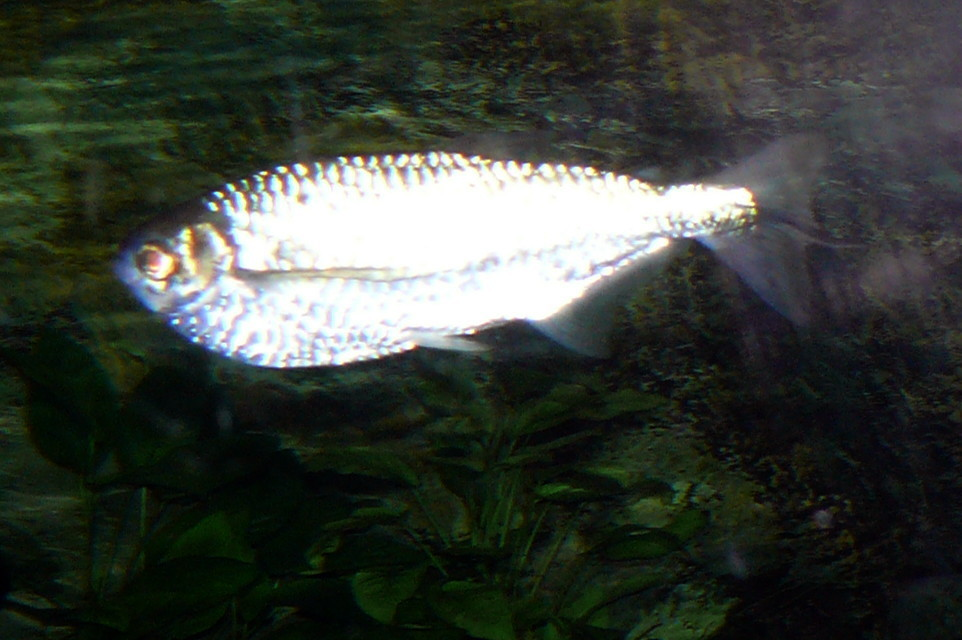
- Triportheus angulatus

Scientific classification
- Kingdom: Animalia
- Phylum: Chordata
- Class: Actinopterygii
- Division: Teleostei
- Order: Characiformes
- Family: Triportheidae
- Subfamily: Triportheinae; Fowler, 1940
- Genus: Triportheus; Cope, 1872

Type species
- Triportheus albus Cope, 1872

Synonyms
- Chalcinus Valenciennes, 1850; Coscinoxyron Fowler, 1907

= Triportheus =

Genus of fishes

Triportheus is a genus of freshwater ray-finned fishes belonging to the family Triportheidae, the hatchet characins or keeled characins. The fishes in this genus are found in South America, including Trinidad, ranging from the Rio de la Plata basin to the basins of the Orinoco and Magdalena. Some are migratory. This genus is classified in the subfamily Triportheinae.

The largest species is up to 36 cm (14 in) in standard length, but most reach up to about 2/3 of that size or less. They somewhat resemble larger, more elongated hatchetfish, including a keeled chest and large pectoral fins. This leads to the common names narrow hatchetfish and elongate hatchetfish, the latter also used more specifically for T. elongatus. Their shape is an adaption for living near the water surface where they find most of their food such as fruits, seeds, leaves, flowers, other plant material, invertebrates (insects, spiders and alike) and occasionally small fish. Seeds eaten by Triportheus are sometimes crushed, but may also pass undamaged through the fish, making them potential seed dispersers.

Some Triportheus species are habitat generalists: T. albus is found in blackwater, whitewater, and clearwater rivers. Fish of this genus are r-strategists, maturing quickly and having a relatively short lifespan; within the Solimões River floodplain, the native Triportheus were noted to have high natural mortality. Larvae inhabit open water, while older individuals (postflexion and juvenile stages) shelter under macrophytes and within the shallows or marginal regions of the waterbody.

Triportheus are exploited commercially in their native range, and some species may be at risk for overfishing. In their native range, multiple species are referred to as sardinas, though there are many other local names.

== Species ==
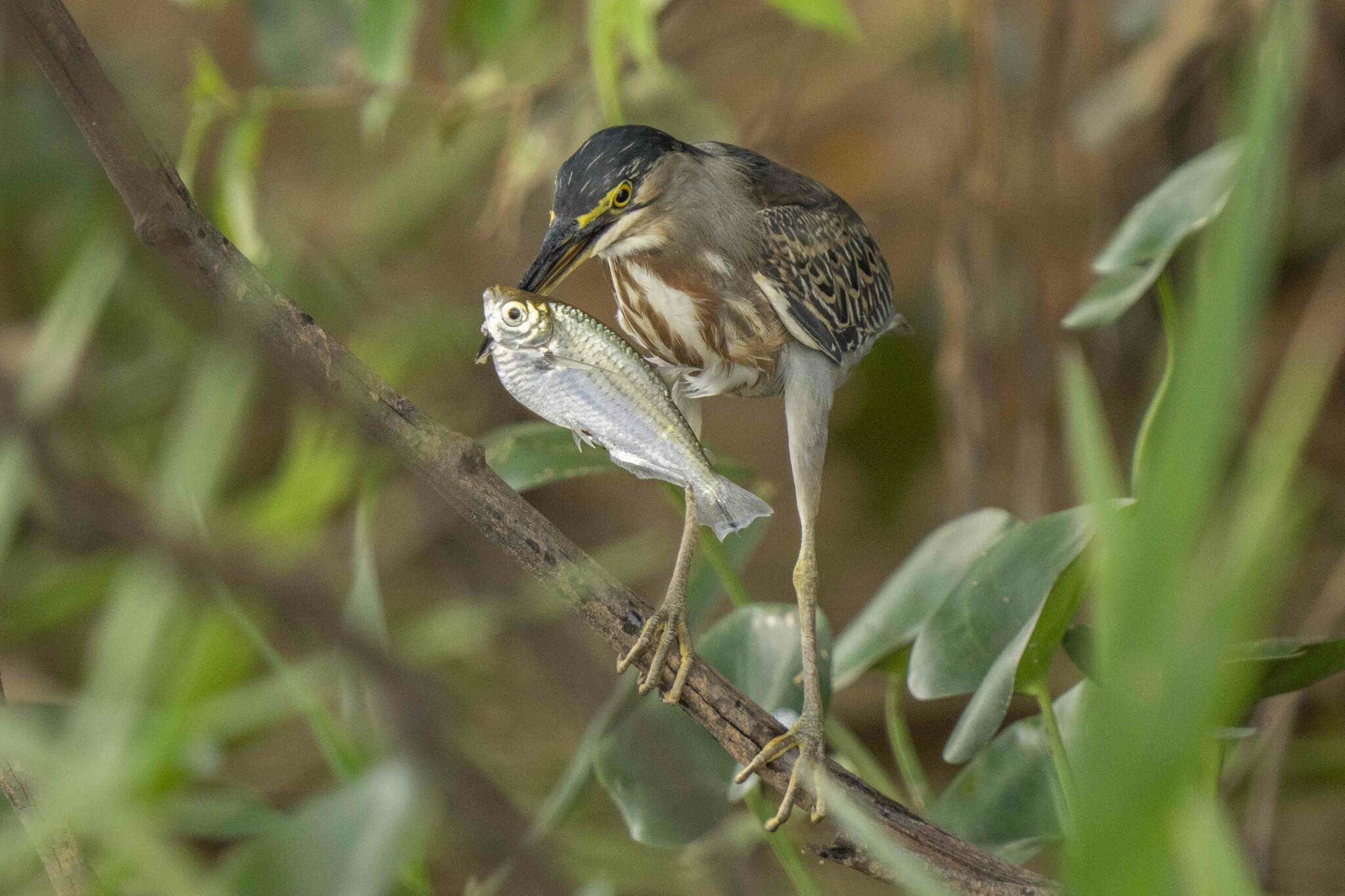
Striated heron eating a Triportheus

The genus encompasses the following species, with the following distributions:

- Triportheus albus Cope, 1872 (Amazon, Araguaia, and Tocantins basin)
- Triportheus angulatus (Spix & Agassiz, 1829) (Amazon basin)
- Triportheus auritus (Valenciennes, 1850) (Amazon, Araguaia, Tocantins, Orinoco basin and North Coastal drainages)
- Triportheus brachipomus (Valenciennes, 1850) (Orinoco basin and North Coastal drainages)
- Triportheus claudiae Lopes & Carvalho, 2024
- Triportheus culter (Cope, 1872) (Amazon basin)
- Triportheus curtus (Garman, 1890)
- Triportheus guentheri (Garman, 1890) (Sao Francisco basin)
- Triportheus magdalenae (Steindachner, 1878) (Magdalena basin)
- Triportheus nematurus (Kner, 1858) (Paraguay and lower Paraná Basin)
- Triportheus orinocensis {M. C. S. L. Malabarba, 2004
- Triportheus pantanensis M. C. S. L. Malabarba, 2004 (Paraguay and lower Paraná Basin)
- Triportheus pictus (Garman, 1890)
- Triportheus rotundatus (Jardine, 1841) (Amazon basin)
- Triportheus signatus (Garman, 1890) (Parnaíba Basin)
- Triportheus trifurcatus (Castelnau, 1855) (Araguaia and Tocantins basin)
- Triportheus venezuelensis M. C. S. L. Malabarba, 2004 (Orinoco basin and North Coastal drainages)

The following cladogram is based on a time-calibrated phylogenetic tree using genetics:

- - - - Triportheus
        - - - - - - - - Triportheus pantanensis
                      - Triportheus angulatus
                    - - Triportheus trifurcatus
                      - - Triportheus sp. nov. (Lagoa Margina/Rio Xingu/Canarana)
                        - Triportheus signatus
                  - Triportheus venezuelensis
                - Triportheus orinocensis
              - - Triportheus nematurus
                - Triportheus aff. rotundatus
            - - - Triportheus brachipomus
                - Triportheus albus
              - Triportheus guentheri
          - - - Triportheus magdalenae
              - Triportheus culter
            - Triportheus rotundatus
        - Triportheus auritus
      - - - - Agoniates
            - Clupeacharax
        - Engraulisoma
    - Lignobrycon
  - Bryconidae
- Gasteropelecidae
