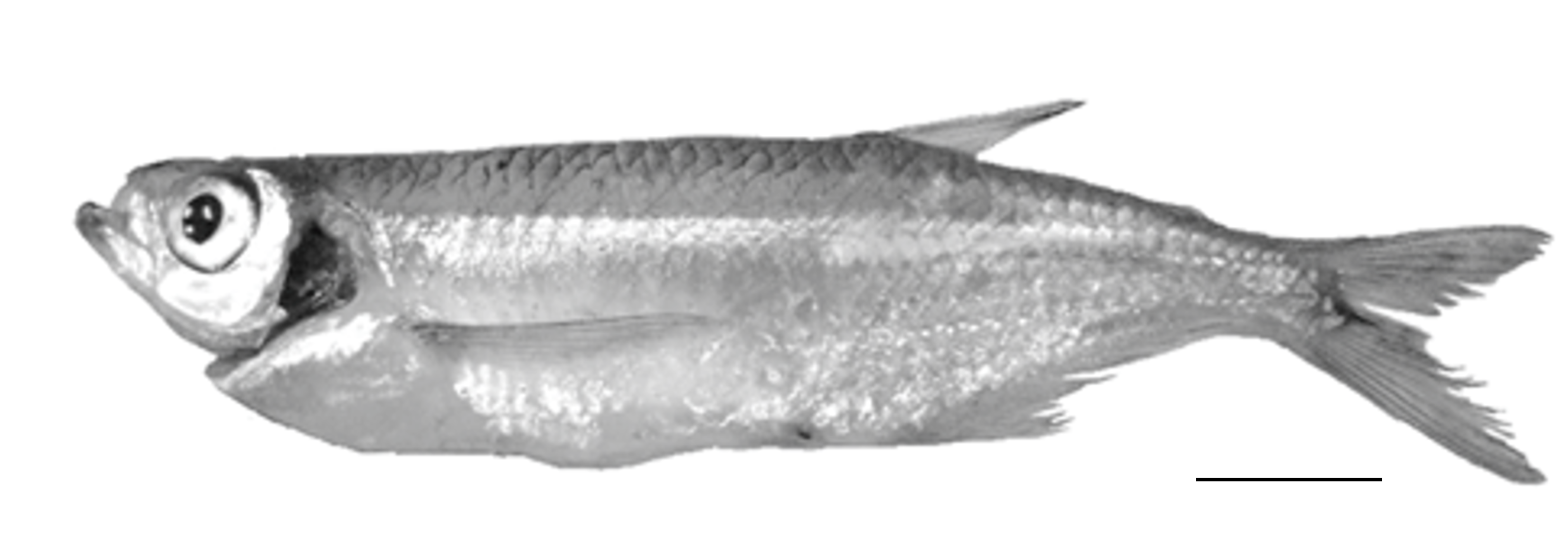

Conservation status
- Near Threatened (IUCN 3.1)

Scientific classification
- Kingdom: Animalia
- Phylum: Chordata
- Class: Actinopterygii
- Order: Characiformes
- Family: Triportheidae
- Genus: Lignobrycon
- Species: L. myersi

Binomial name
- Lignobrycon myersi (P. de Miranda Ribeiro, 1956)

Synonyms
- Moojenichthys myersi P. de Miranda Ribeiro, 1956

= Lignobrycon myersi =

Species of fish

Lignobrycon myersi is a species of freshwater ray-finned fish belonging to the family Triportheidae, the hatchet characins. This fish is endemic to Bahia in Brazil. It is the only extant species in the genus Lignobrycon.

== Taxonomy ==
Lignobrycon myersi was first formally described as Moojenichthys myersi in 1956 by the Brazilian zoologist Paulo de Miranda Ribeiro, with its type locality given as the Rio Braço in Ilhéus, Bahia. In 1998, it was reclassified in the otherwise fossil genus Lignobrycon. The genus Lignobrycon has one other definite species, the type species †L. ligniticus, and possibly one other species, †L. altus, with these latter two species being extinct and known only from fossils. The genus Lignobrycon is classified within the hatchet characin family Triportheidae, in the suborder Characoidei of the order Characiformes. Eschmeyer's Catalog of Fishes appears to place this genus in the subfamily Triportheinae, but other authors place it in the Agoniatinae.

== Etymology ==
Lignobrycon myersi is the only extant species in the genus Lignobrycon. This name uses the prefix ligno-, a derivation of lignum, a Latin word meaning "gathered wood" or "firewood". This name was originally applied to this genus as the type species, L. ligniticus, was found in Tertiary deposits of lignite in São Paulo. This is prefixed to brycon, a component of many scientific names of characiform fishes which is derived from brýchō, meaning to "bite", "gnash teeth" or "eat greedily". This originally referred to the full set of teeth on each maxilla. The specific name honours the American ichthyologist George S. Myers of Stanford University.

== Description ==
Lignobrycon myersi has a maximum standard length of 8.5 cm (3.3 in). The dorsal fin is supported by 2 spines and 8 soft rays, while the anal fin contain 4 spines and 31–35 soft rays.

== Distribution and habitat ==
Lignobrycon myersi is endemic to Brazil. From its description up to 2004 it was known only from the Rio Braço in the vicinity of Ilhéus in southern Bahia. In 2004 it was found in the drainage of the Rio Contas, near Jequié. These are both independent coastal rivers, unconnected to each other, but which may have been linked in the past. The Rio Braço at Santa Luzia farm, where this species was rediscovered in 1988, is approximately 10 to 25 m (33 to 82 ft) wide and between 1.5 and 3 m (4 ft 11 in and 9 ft 10 in) in depth. It has a sandy-muddy bottom with scattered boulders. At the time of the species rediscovery, this river flowed through an area of Atlantic coastal forest where the understory had been cleared for cocoa farming. The river water is relatively clear and dark, i.e. it is a black water stream, and when the first specimens were collected, its temperature was 21 °C (70 °F).

== Biology ==
Lignobrycon myersi shares its habitat with Astyanax sp., Nematocharax venustus, Oligosarcus macroplepis, Characidium sp., Steindachnerina elegans, Hoplias malabaricus, Rhamdia sp., Poecilia sp., Geophagus brasiliensis, and the non-native predator Astronotus ocellatus from the Amazon. They feed on mosquito larvae and other aquatic invertebrates, but a major component of the diet can be terrestrial insects, suggesting they forage close to the shore.
