= Colpodon =

Colpodon Temporal range: Early Miocene (Colhuehuapian-Santacrucian) ~21–17.5 Ma

Scientific classification
- Kingdom: Animalia
- Phylum: Chordata
- Class: Mammalia
- Infraclass: Placentalia
- Order: †Notoungulata
- Family: †Leontiniidae
- Genus: †Colpodon; Burmeister 1885

Type species
- †Colpodon propinquus Burmeister, 1885

Species
- C. antucoensis Shockey et al 2012; C. distinctus Ameghino 1902; C. plicatus Ameghino 1904; C. propinquus Burmeister 1885

Extinct genus of notoungulates

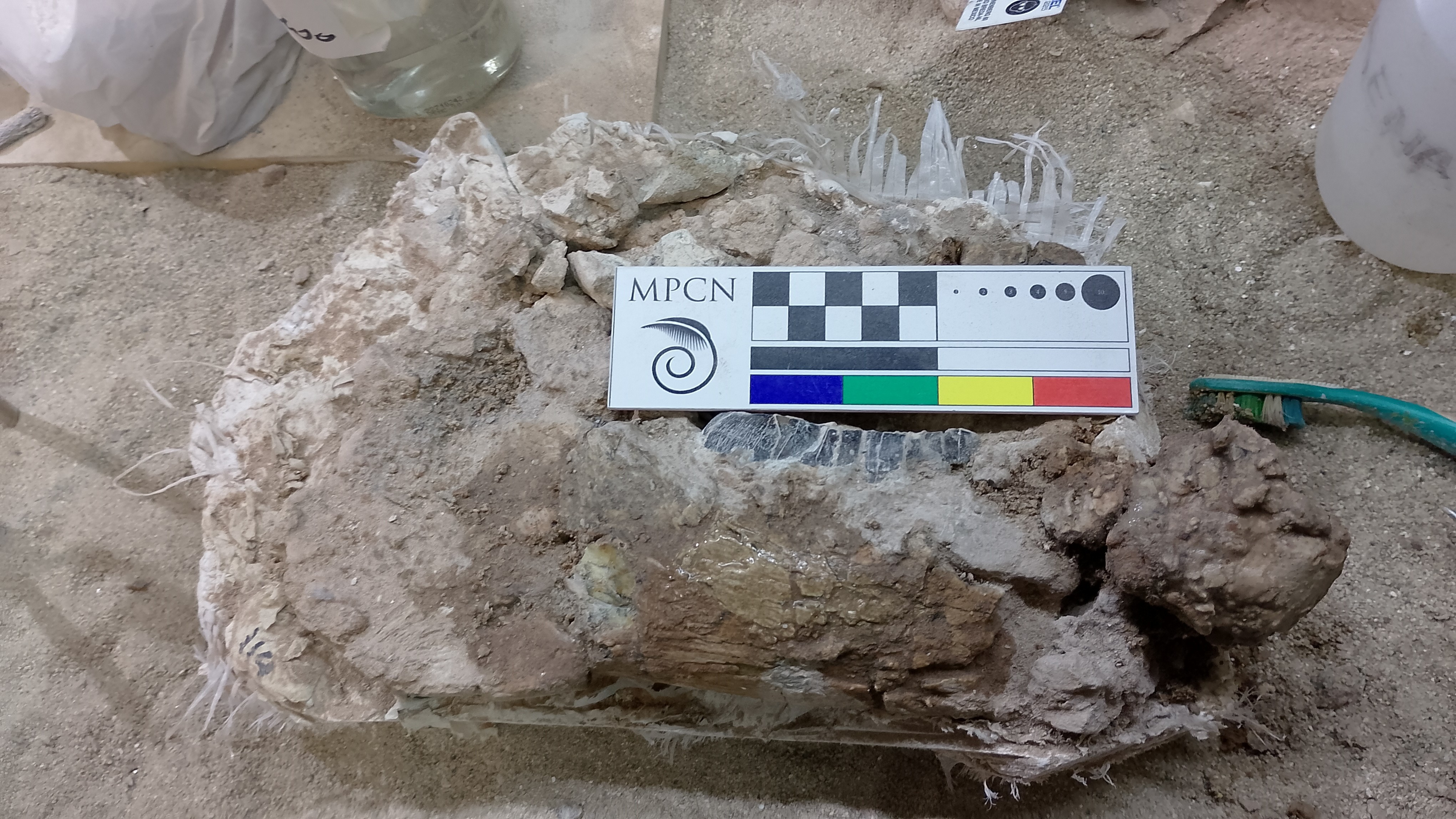
Top view of the lower part of the mandibular region corresponding to a specimen of Colpodon propinquus. This specimen belongs to the paleontological collection of the Museo Patagónico de Ciencias Naturales Juan Carlos Salgado (MPCN).

Colpodon is an extinct genus of herbivorous mammal, belonging to the order Notoungulata. It lived during the Early Miocene, in what is today Argentina and Chile, in South America.

== Description ==
This animal is almost exclusively known from cranial remains, and its general appearance is globally unknown. From a comparison with some of its better known relatives, like Scarrittia and Huilatherium, it can be supposed that Colpodon was a relatively heavy-shaped animal, with a stature comparable to that of a sheep. Its skull was rather short and tall, with a characteristic set of teeth, differing from most of its close relatives, the Leontiniidae. The upper canines were completely absent, and the incisors were well-developed by lacking labial girdles.

== Classification ==
Colpodon was one of the first notoungulates ever discovered. It was first described in 1885 by Hermann Burmeister, who described the genus based on two upper and two lower molars found near the mouth of the Chubut River in Argentina. Burmeister considered Colpodon as an intermediate form between Nesodon and Homalodotherium. Subsequently, Burmeister described another species of Colpodon, C. propinquus. In the early 1900s, Florentino Ameghino described other species of Colpodon, C. distinctus and C. plicatus, and believed that this animal was a member of the family Leontiniidae. In the following years Colpodon was variously placed among Leontiniidae and Notohippidae due to its peculiar dentition with characters shared by both families; Colpodon also had a symmetrical astragalus, like the Notohippidae. In 2012 another species of Colpodon, C. antucoensis, was described from Chile. This species is slightly more recent than the type species, and is differentiated from it by some dental characters and a narrower muzzle. Moreover, other fossil remains assigned to this genus have been found in the Chichinales Formation of Río Negro Province in Argentina.

Colpodon is currently considered a derived member of the family Leontiniidae, a group of heavy-built notoungulates common during the Oligocene. The 2012 study showed a close relationship between Colpodon, Huilatherium and Taubatherium, two leontiniids from a tropical clade whose remains have been found in Colombia and Brazil.
