= Frei Galvão =

Catholic saint (1739–1822)

Saint Anthony of St. Ann Galvão OFM
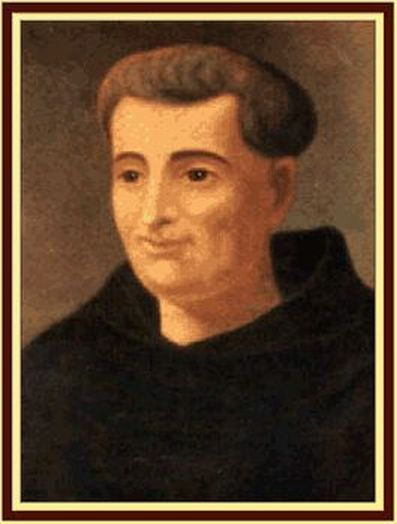
- Anthony of St. Ann Galvão

Friar
- Born: 13 May 1739; Guaratinguetá, Brazil, Portuguese Empire
- Died: 23 December 1822 (aged 83); São Paulo, Empire of Brazil
- Venerated in: Roman Catholic Church (Order of Friars Minor and Brazil)
- Beatified: 25 October 1998, Rome by Pope John Paul II
- Canonized: 11 May 2007, Campo de Marte Airport, São Paulo, Brazil, by Pope Benedict XVI
- Major shrine: Monastery of Light, São Paulo, Brazil
- Feast: 11 May
- Patronage: World Youth Day 2013

Anthony of St. Ann Galvão (Portuguese: Antônio de Sant'Anna Galvão; 13 May 1739 – 23 December 1822), more commonly known as Frei Galvão, was a Brazilian friar of the Franciscan Order.

One of the best-known religious figures in colonial Brazil renowned for his healing powers, Galvão was canonized by Pope Benedict XVI on 11 May 2007, becoming the first Brazilian-born saint. He was the second Brazilian to be proclaimed a saint by the Catholic Church.

== Life ==
=== Early life ===
Galvão was born in the freguesia of Santo Antonio of Guaratinguetá, in the captaincy of São Paulo. He was the fourth of ten children in a deeply religious family of high social and political status. His father, Antônio Galvão de França, was the captain of the village. Although he was active in the world of politics and commerce, Antônio the father also belonged to the Third Order of Saint Francis and was known for his generosity. His mother, Isabel Leite de Barros, was from a farming family, and was a great-granddaughter of the famous bandeirante explorer Fernão Dias Pais, known as the "Emerald Hunter". She gave birth to eleven children before her premature death in 1755, at age 38. Equally known for her generosity, Isabel was found to have given away all of her clothes to the poor at the time of her death.

At age 13, Galvão was sent to the Jesuit-run seminary Colégio de Belém in Cachoeira, Bahia by his father, which wished to provide humanities and cultural training to his son. He followed his brother José, who was already studying there. At Colégio de Belém, which he attended from 1752 to 1756, Galvão made great progress in social studies and Christian practice. He aspired to become a Jesuit priest, but the anti-Jesuit persecution led by Sebastião José de Carvalho e Melo, the Marquis of Pombal, led him to enter the Franciscan Order instead. in Taubaté, following the advice of his father.

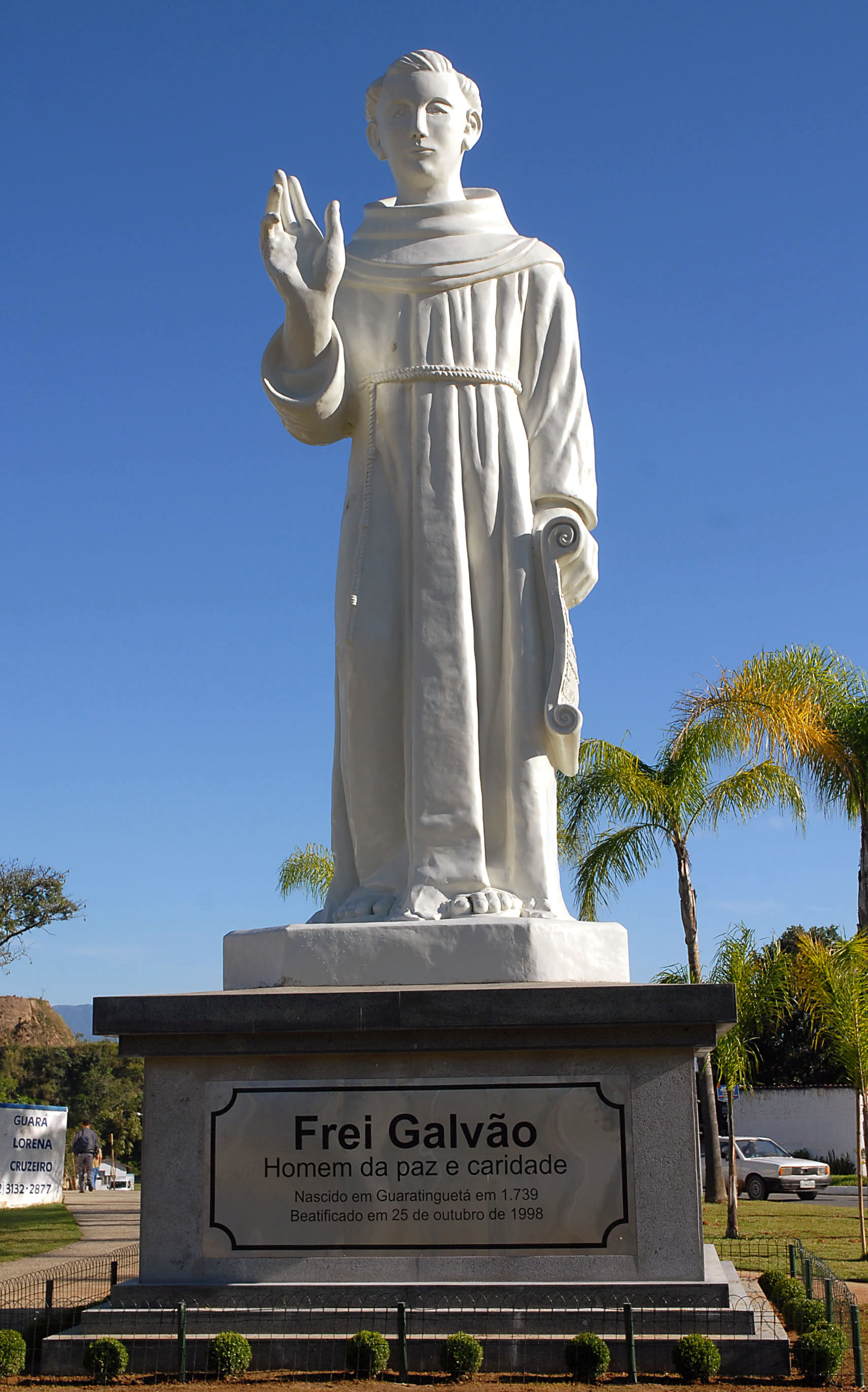
Monument to Frei Galvão in his native town of Guaratinguetá.

=== Franciscan friar ===
At age 16, Galvão gave up a promising future and his family's social influence, becoming a novice at the St. Bonaventure Friary in Vila de Macacu, Rio de Janeiro. There, he adopted the religious name of Anthony of Saint Ann, in honor of his family's devotion to Saint Ann. During his novitiate year, he was known for his piety, zeal and exemplary virtues. Galvão made his profession of solemn vows on 16 April 1761, taking the additional vow to defend the Blessed Virgin Mary's title of the "Immaculate Conception", which was still a controversial teaching at that time.

On 11 July 1762, Galvão was ordained a priest and transferred to St. Francis Friary in the city of São Paulo, where he continued his studies in theology and philosophy. In early 1766, around the completion of his studies, Galvão made a spiritual submission of himself as a "servant and slave" of the Blessed Mother, signing a document to this effect, dated 9 March, which he signed in his own blood. In 1768 he was appointed preacher, confessor and porter of the friary, an important post.

From 1769 to 1770 Galvão served as confessor to the Recollection of St. Teresa (Portuguese: Recolhimento de Santa Teresa) in the city of São Paulo, which was a hermitage of women Recollects (recluses living in common but not under religious vows), dedicated to Teresa of Ávila. There, he met the nun Helena Maria of the Holy Spirit, a recluse who claimed to have had visions in which Jesus was asking her to found a new Recollect house. Galvão, her confessor, studied these messages and consulted with others who recognized them as valid and supernatural.

Galvão collaborated in the foundation of the new Recollect house, named Our Lady of the Conception of Divine Providence, which was established on 2 February 1774 in the same city. It was modeled after the Conceptionist nuns, and became the home for girls who wished to live a religious life but without taking vows. With Helena's sudden death on 23 February 1775, Galvão became the new superior of the community, serving as the Recollects' new spiritual leader.

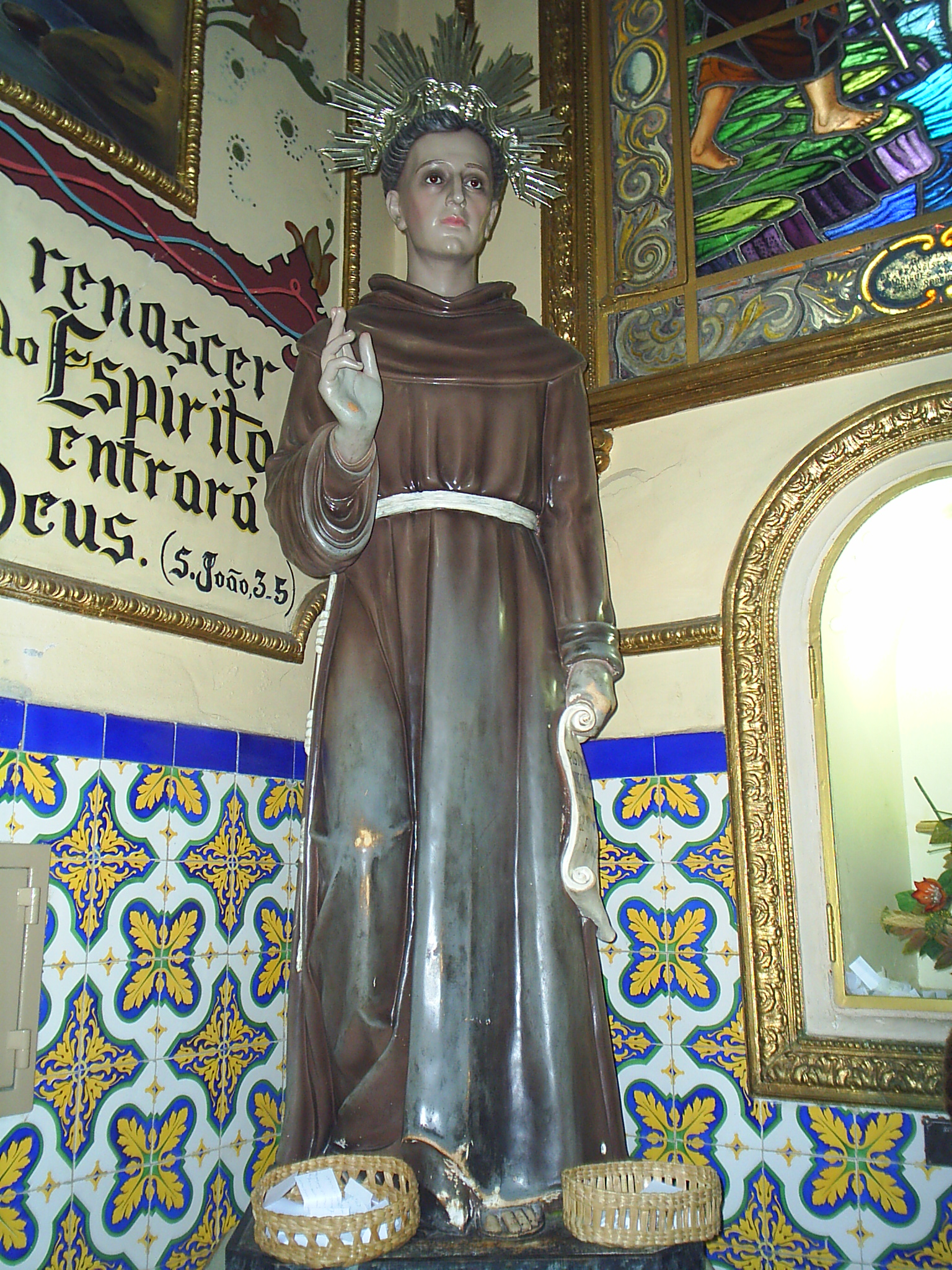
Frei Galvão in the Cathedral of St. Anthony in Guaratinguetá.

Around that time, a change in São Paulo's provincial government brought an inflexible leader who ordered the closing of the hermitage. Galvão accepted the decision, but the recluses refused to leave the premises, and due to popular pressure and the efforts of the Bishop of São Paulo, the hermitage was soon re-opened. Subsequently, with the increasing number of new recluses, more living space was required. It took Galvão 28 years to build the hermitage and church, with the latter being inaugurated on 15 August 1802. In addition to the construction work and duties within and outside his Order, Galvão committed himself to the Recollect's formation. The Statutes he wrote for them was a guide for the interior life and religious discipline.

When things seemed more quiet, another government intervention brought Galvão a further trial. The Captain General sentenced a soldier to death for having slightly offended his son, and the friar was sent into exile for coming to the soldier's defence. Again, popular demand succeeded in having the order revoked.

In 1781, Galvão was appointed novice master in Cachoeiras de Macacu. However, the Recollects and the Bishop of São Paulo appealed to the Minister Provincial, writing that "none of the inhabitants of this city will be able to bear the absence of this Religious for a single moment". As a result, he returned. He was later named Guardian of St. Francis Friary in São Paulo in 1798, being re-appointed in 1801.

In 1811 Galvão founded St. Clare Friary in Sorocaba. Eleven months later, he returned to São Paulo. In his old age, he obtained permission from the bishop and the Guardian to stay at the Recollect house. He died there on 23 December 1822. Galvão was laid to rest in the Recollection Church, and his tomb continues to be a destination for pilgrimages of the faithful, who obtain graces through his intercession.

In 1929, the Convent of Our Lady of the Conception of Divine Providence became a monastery, incorporated into the Order of the Immaculate Conception. The building, now called the "Monastery of Light", has been declared a world cultural heritage site by UNESCO. The complex now serves as the Museum of the Sacred Arts of São Paulo.

== Mysticism ==
Galvão was a man of great and intense prayer, and mystic phenomena attributed to him include telepathy, premonition and levitation. He was reportedly in two different places at the same time in order to take care of sick or dying people who had asked for his help.

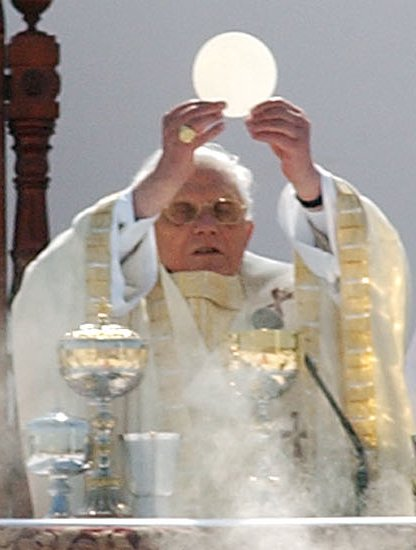
Pope Benedict XVI celebrates Holy Mass at the canonization of Frei Galvão in São Paulo, Brazil on 11 May 2007

Many sought Galvão for his reputed healing powers, particularly when medical resources were expensive or unavailable. Galvão became known for his "paper pills": he wrote a Latin phrase from the Little Office of Our Lady: "Post partum Virgo permansisti: O Mater Dei, pro nobis intercede". ("After childbirth thou didst remain a Virgin: O Mother of God, intercede for us") on a piece of paper, rolled it like a pill, and gave it to suffering patients. Once he gave the paper pill to a young woman in excruciating pain from kidney stones: the pain ceased immediately after she consumed it, and she expelled a large amount of renal calculus. On other occasions, he gave it to women suffering during difficult childbirths. After Galvão gave a paper pill to a man with such a suffering wife, the child was quickly born without further complications. The story of the miracle pill spread, and Galvão had to teach the Recollect Sisters to make them, which they still do nowadays. They are handed out for free to some 300 faithful who request them daily.

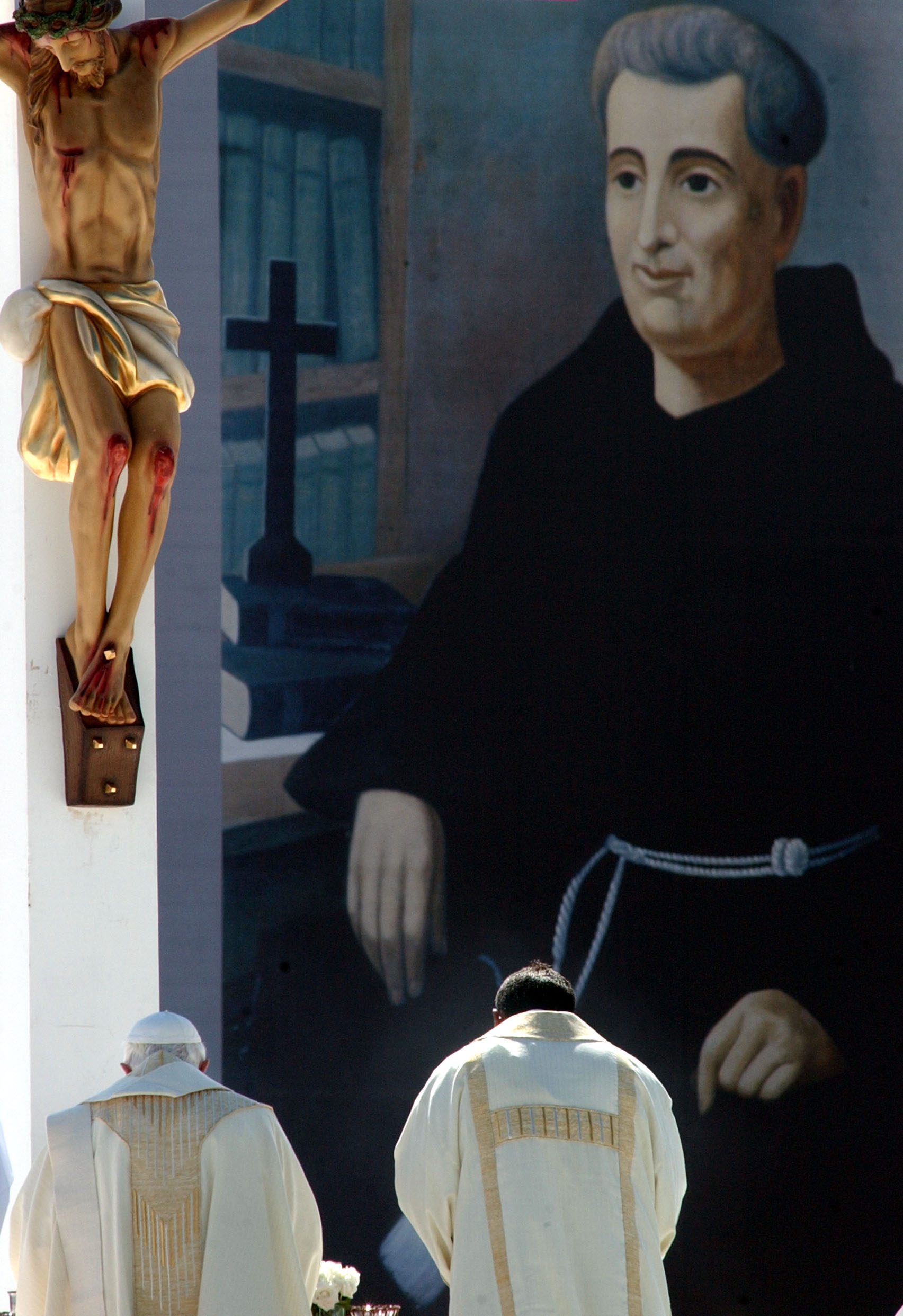
Pope Benedict XVI at the canonization of Frei Galvão (in the picture).

On 25 October 1998, Galvão became the first Brazilian-born person to be beatified by the Vatican, having been declared Venerable a year earlier, on 8 March 1997. On 11 May 2007, he became the first Brazilian-born person canonized by the Roman Catholic Church, during Pope Benedict XVI's five-day visit to Brazil. The open-air ceremony, which lasted over two hours in the Campo de Marte Military Airport, near downtown São Paulo, drew 800,000 people, according to official estimates. Galvão was the first saint canonized by Pope Benedict XVI in a ceremony held outside the Vatican City. His proclamation as a saint came after the Catholic Church accepted that two miracles had taken place.

According to the Catholic Church, the cases of Sandra Grossi de Almeida and Daniella Cristina da Silva are miracles effected through the prayers of Galvão. After taking one of the paper pills, Almeida, who had a uterine malformation that should have made it impossible for her to carry a child for more than four months, gave birth to baby boy Enzo. Galvão's pills are also certified by the church with the healing, in 1990, of Daniella Cristina da Silva, a four-year-old girl suffering from what doctors considered incurable hepatitis. Doctors, and some Catholic clergy, have dismissed the pills as placebos. The church recommends that only terminally ill patients take the pills.
