= Guaratinguetá =

- Municipality
- Municipality of Guaratinguetá
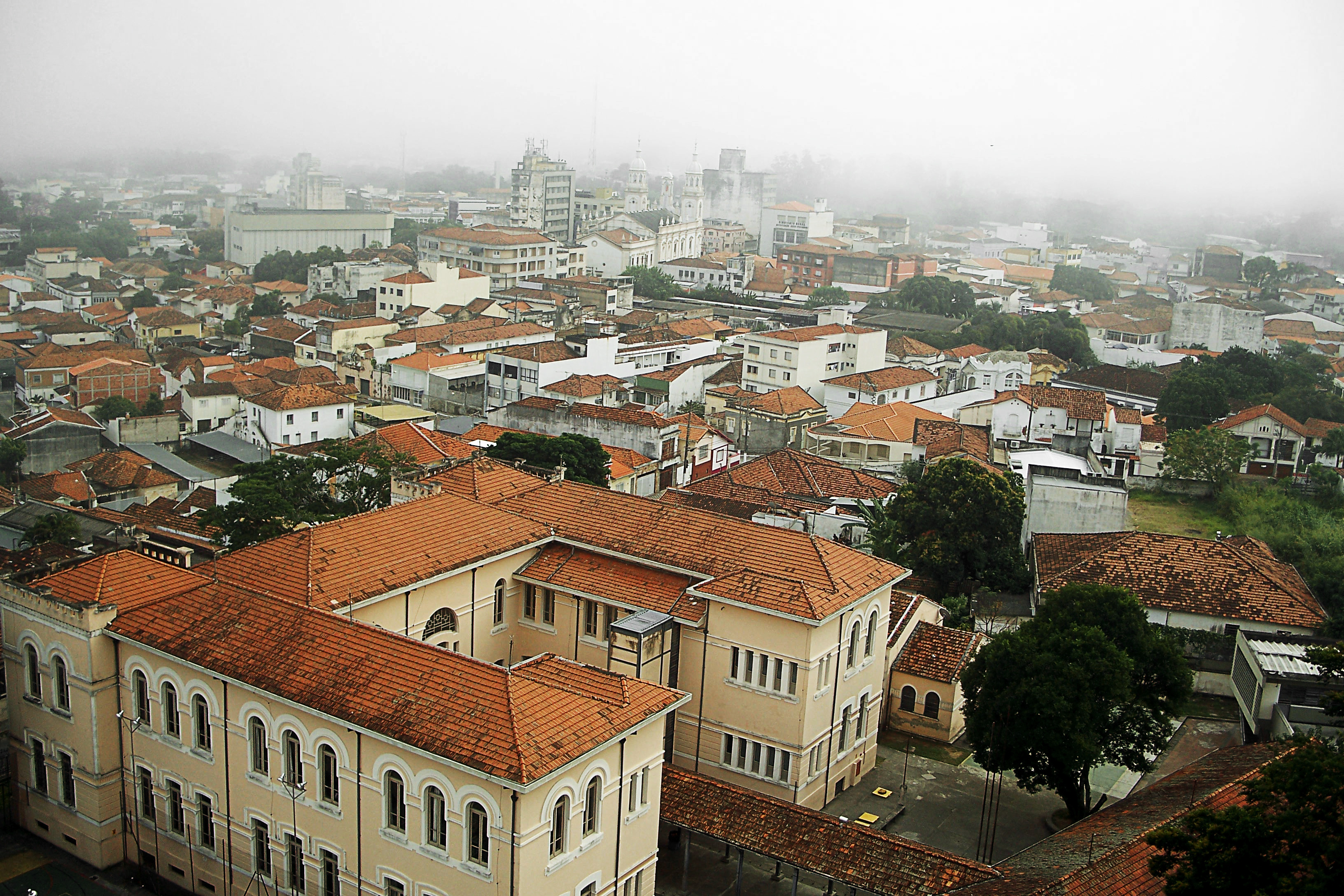
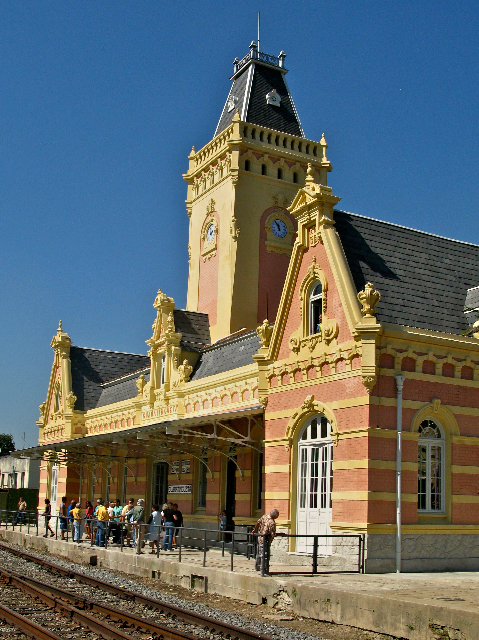
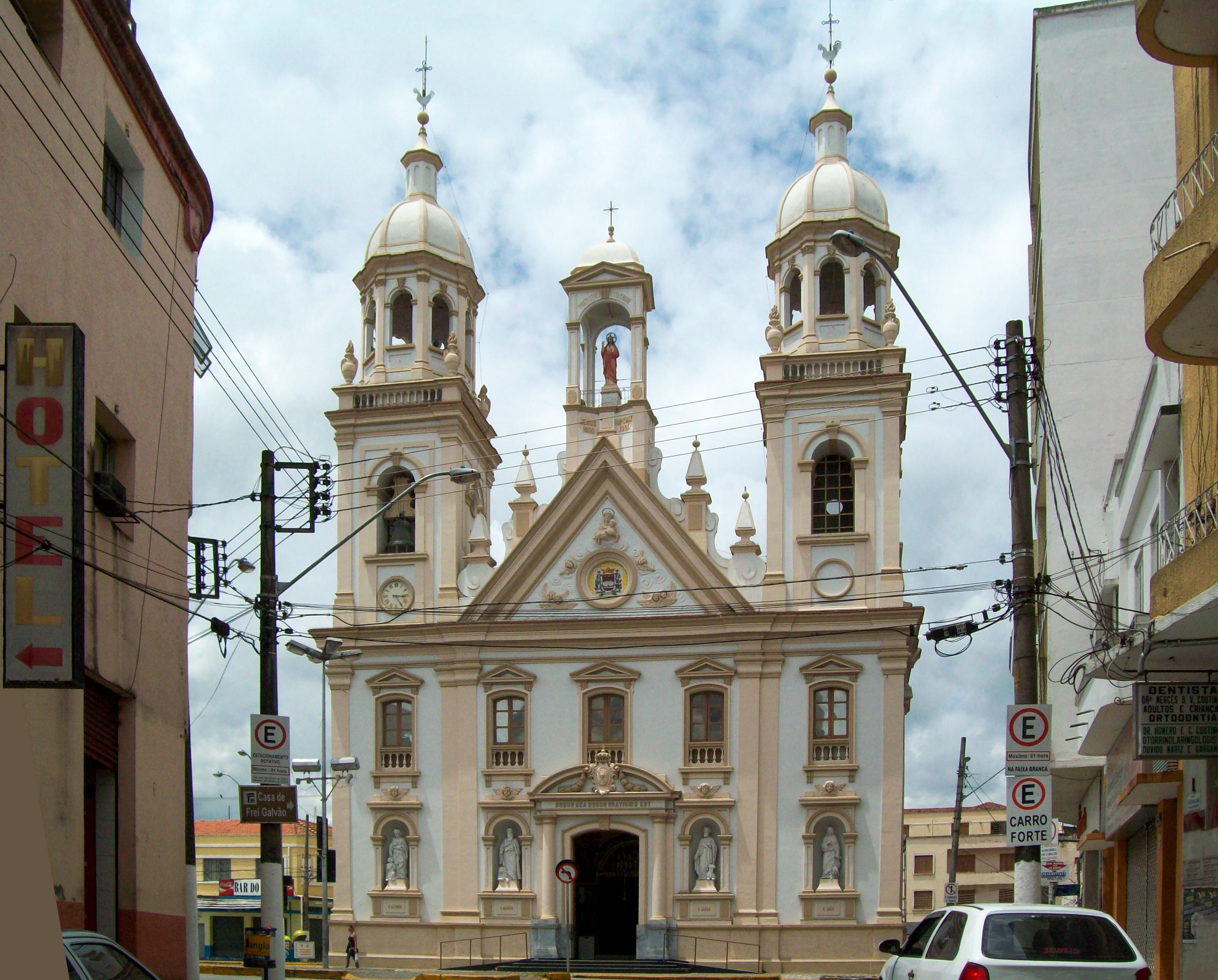
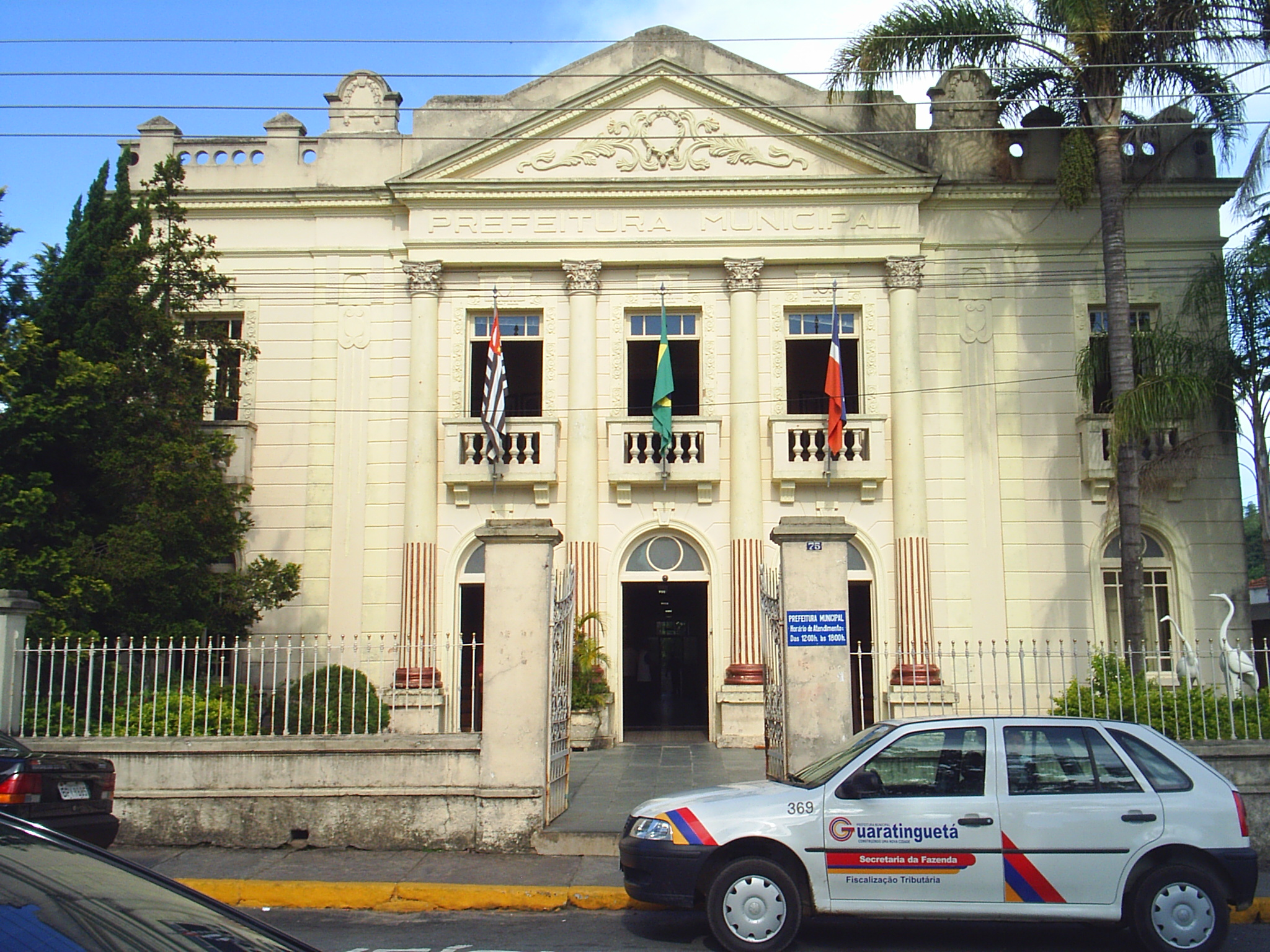
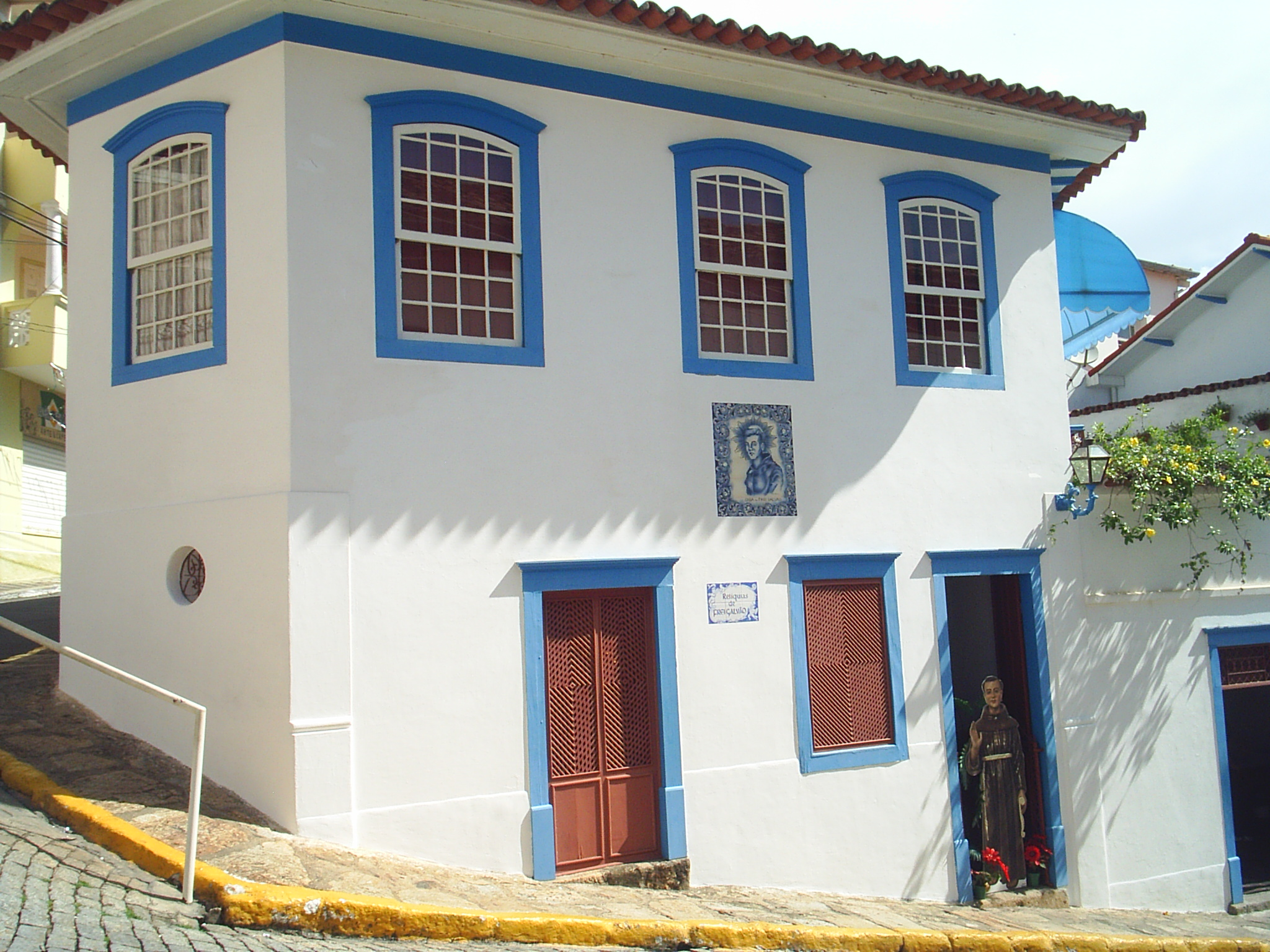
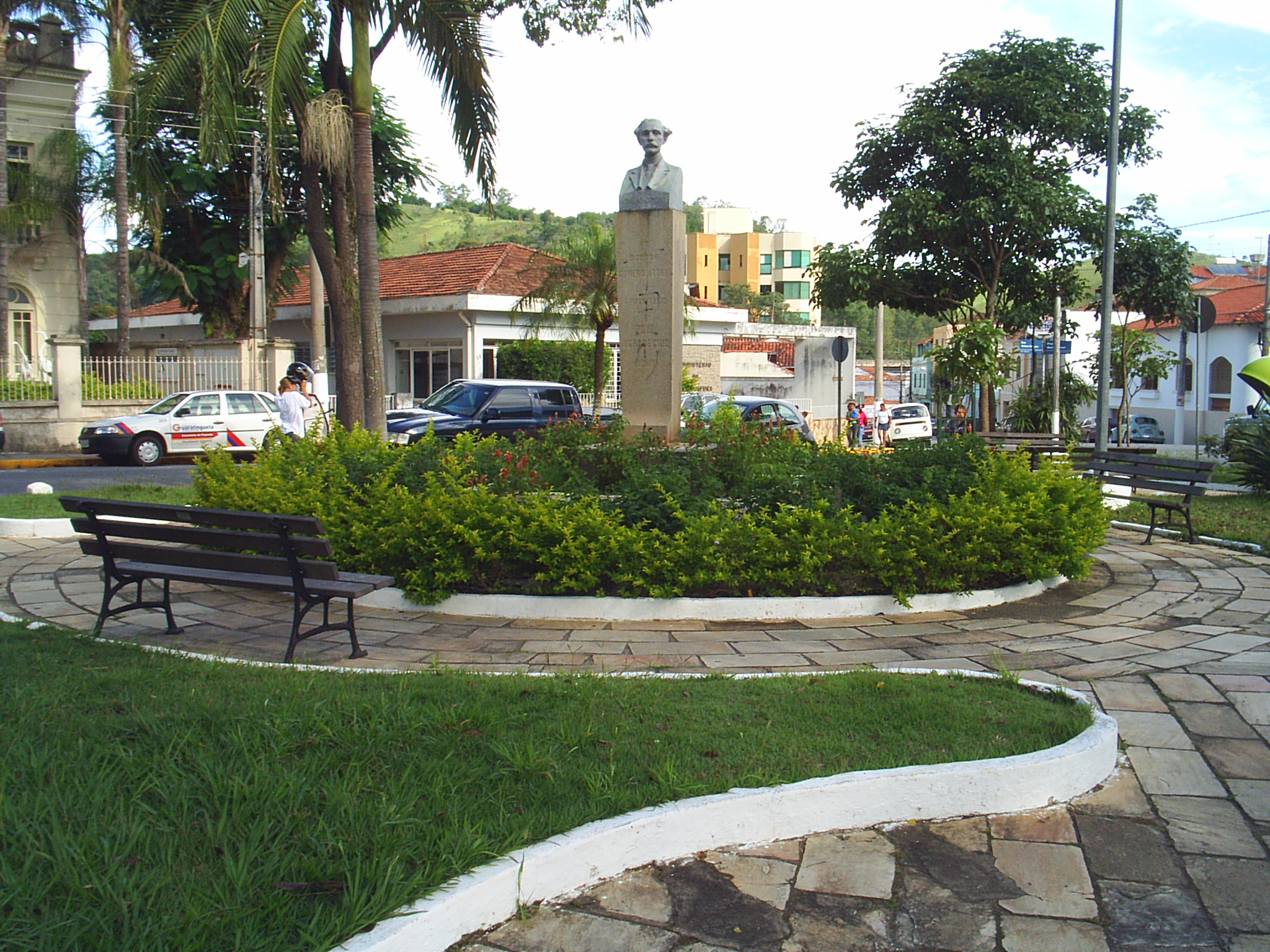

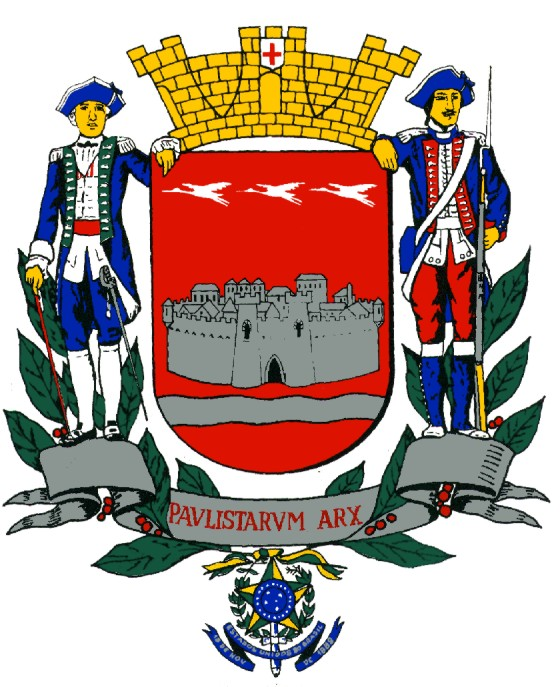
- Flag Coat of arms
- Motto: Paulistarum arx (Latin)
- Location of Guaratinguetá in São Paulo state

- Location within Brazil
- Coordinates: 22°49′00″S 45°13′40″W
- Country: Brazil
- Region: Southeast Brazil
- State: São Paulo
- Metropolitan Region: Vale do Paraíba e Litoral Norte
- Established: June 13, 1630

Area
  - Total: 752.64 km^{2} (290.60 sq mi)

Population (2022 Census)
  - Total: 118,044
  - Estimate (2025): 121,916
  - Density: 156.84/km^{2} (406.21/sq mi)
- HDI (2010): 0.798 – high
- Website: www.guaratingueta.sp.gov.br

Guaratinguetá is a municipality in the state of São Paulo in Brazil. It is part of the Metropolitan Region of Vale do Paraíba e Litoral Norte. The population is 118,044 (2022 Census) in an area of 752.64 km^{2}. It is located in the region of Vale do Paraíba; prominent individuals from the area include Saint Frei Galvão, Brazilian President Rodrigues Alves and the cardiologist Dr Euryclides de Jesus Zerbini. The name of the city derives from the words in the Tupi language: gûyra (heron), tinga (white) and etá (many), resulting in Gûyrating'etá (meeting of white herons).

The municipality contains part of the 292,000-hectare (720,000-acre) Mananciais do Rio Paraíba do Sul Environmental Protection Area, created in 1982 to protect the sources of the Paraíba do Sul river.

== History ==
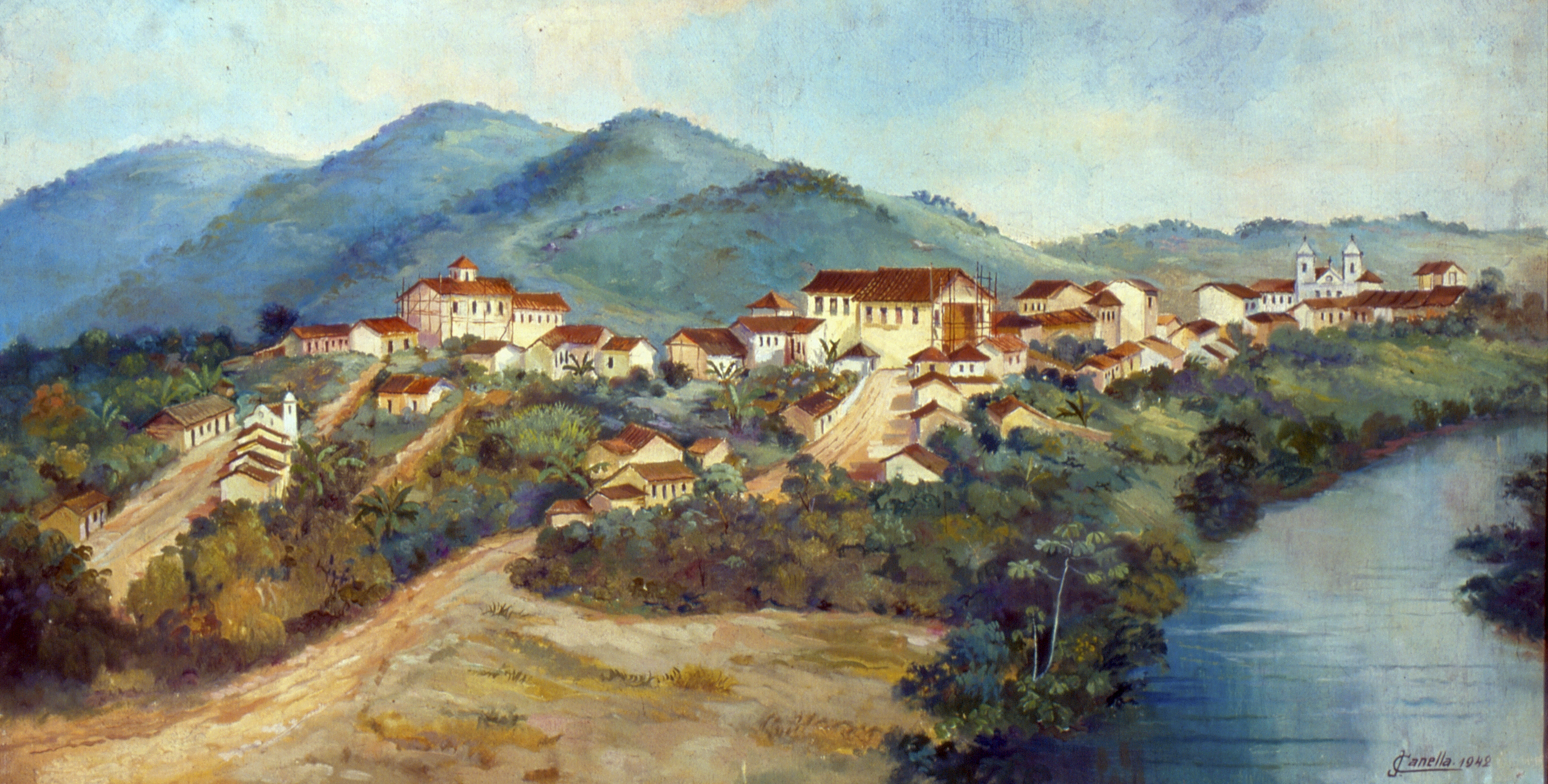
Guaratinguetá in 1835, according to painting by José Canella Filho.

Since early times, Guaratinguetá was known by the Indians of the region for the abundance of herons that lived on the edges of the Paraíba do Sul river. The first Portuguese settlers arrived at the end of the 16th century, after rumours of mineral wealth hidden in Serra da Mantiqueira, in the lands known today as Minas Gerais. The settlement of the region began in 1628, with the donation of lands by Jacques Felix and his children. On June 13, 1630, construction began of a chapel, that was registered first in Livro-Tombo da Matriz of Santo Antonio.

On February 13, 1651, by intervention of Captain Domingos Leme, a village was raised for the Saint Antonio of Guaratinguetá, with the opening of the main road. By tradition, the pillory was also raised. During the 18th century, Guaratinguetá became the main point of supply for the gold miners coming from Minas Gerais as commerce on the route developed. During that period, the foreign travellers who had passed through there perpetuated the image of Guaratinguetá, as much in books as in paintings, and the village grew. The few narrow streets were filled by people at the end of the century on Sundays, holidays, and religious celebrations.

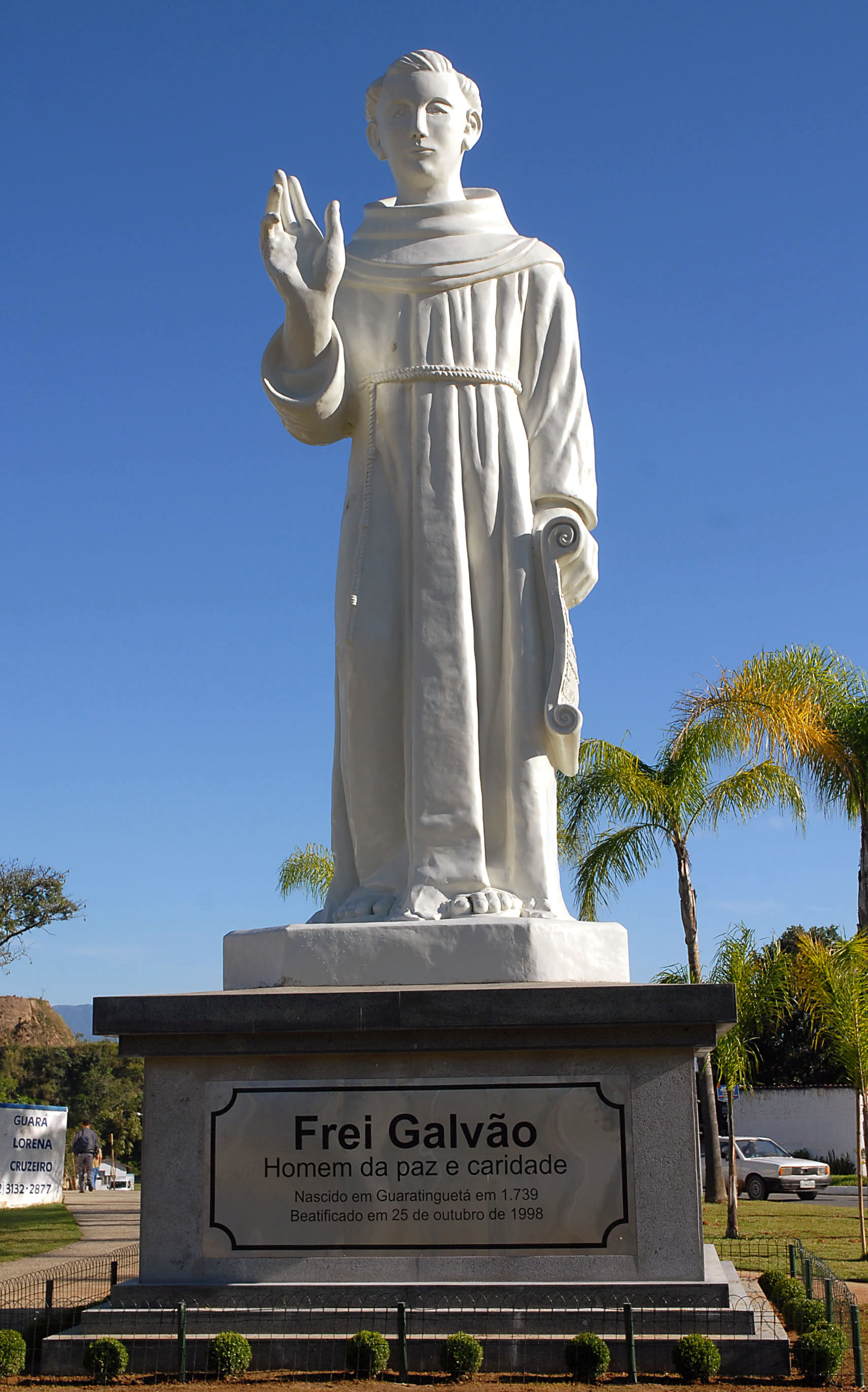
Statue of Friar Anthony of Saint Anne Galvão (Friar Galvão), first Brazilian- born Catholic saint.

Guaratinguetá entered a more religious significance in 1717. In 1757, it held the second biggest party in Louvor to a Saint in the city. Diogo Antônio de Feijó, future priest and regent of the empire of Dom Pedro II, studied in Guaratinguetá with the Manoel Frank Gonçalves during the years of 1795 and 1798.

In the 19th century, Guaratinguetá grew in coffee production, at the same time as it suffered a decline of sugar production. During the Brazilian independence, Dom Pedro I spend the night in the city on August 18 of 1822, stimulating more economic development, and more growth in the coffee industry. The village became a city in 1844, and was incorporated in 1852. During this time, coffee was used as a hard currency, and the daily life of the city was changed forever. It raised man power in the farms, the city grew, and the children of the farmers were sent to study. Commercial merchandise came by donkey to the port of Parati and grew even more.

Rodrigues Alves, born on July 7, 1848, was the council member of the empire, a member of the Chamber of Deputies, president of the Province of São Paulo and twice President of the Republic (Brazil). He was inaugurated by a daily O Mosaico, Development came with the iron horse in 1877 with the construction made way for the immigrants who came to substitute man power. The end of the 19th century marked the inauguration of a theater Carlos Gomes, Da Ponte Metálica, the Banco Popular, the market, the water supply, the urban net of sewer and the installation of the first pertained Grupo Escolar in the city in the building Dr. Flamínio Lessa.

In the 20th century lands became exhausted from over farming, and coffee production declined. The fall extensive farming brought a new economic focus of industrialization and the return to commerce. Education became another focus with the installation of the Escola de Especialista de Aeronáutica (School of Specialist of Aeronautics), the campus of UNESP with the Faculdade de Engenharia (College of Engineering) of the Faculdade de tecnologia (College of Technology FATEC), and the SENAC. Tourism is also important, with the increase of popularity of Frei Galvão, the visitation of caves, and the local churches and monasteries. Inside the city itself, there are many colonial houses with the beautiful architecture of the last century. In addition to this, Agricultural tourism and Eco-Tourism are becoming popular, owing to the beauty of the wilderness and agricultural areas.

== Transportation ==
The city is served by Edu Chaves Airport.

== Data ==
(Source: IBGE/ 2014 - IBGE)

Total population: 118 378 hab. (SP: 62º)

- Urban: 109.012
- Rural: 9.366
- Male: 52.895
- Female: 65.483

== Media ==
In telecommunications, the city was served by Telecomunicações de São Paulo. In July 1998, this company was acquired by Telefónica, which adopted the Vivo brand in 2012. The company is currently an operator of cell phones, fixed lines, internet (fiber optics/4G) and television (satellite and cable).

== See also ==
- List of municipalities in São Paulo
