= Taubatherium =

Taubatherium Temporal range: Late Oligocene ~24 Ma

Scientific classification
- Kingdom: Animalia
- Phylum: Chordata
- Class: Mammalia
- Order: †Notoungulata
- Family: †Leontiniidae
- Genus: †Taubatherium; Soria & Alvarenga 1989

Type species
- †Taubatherium paulacoutoi Soria & Alvarenga, 1989

Synonyms
- T. major Soria & Alvarenga 1989

Extinct genus of mammals

Taubatherium is an extinct genus of mammal, belonging to the order Notoungulata. It lived during the Late Oligocene, in what is today Brazil, in South America.

== Description ==
Fossils of this animal indicates that it had a fairly robust build, but not as heavy as some of its relatives, Leontinia and Scarrittia. The robust body was supported by four relatively slender but strong limbs; the dimensions of Taubatherium were typical of its family, as it was approximately 1.80 meters long and 80 centimeters high at the withers. It weighed between 280 and 350 kilograms, similar to a modern pony.

== Classification ==
Taubatherium was first described in 1983 by Carlos de Paula Couto, based on cranial and postcranial fragmentary remains found in the Tremembé Formation, near Taubaté, in Brazil. Paula Couto believed that the fossils belonged to the already existing genus Leontinia, and described the remains as Leontinia cf. gaudryi. In 1989, these remains were attributed to a new genus of notoungulates, Taubatherium. In addition to the type species, Taubatherium paulacoutoi, another species, T. major was described from the same formation and based on a single upper molar. This latter species is currently considered a synonym to the type species.

Taubatherium was a member of the family Leontiniidae, a group of heavy-built notoungulates that thrived during the Oligocene. Taubatherium seems to have been part of a tropical clade, also including Huilatherium and Colpodon.

== Paleobiology ==
=== Palaeoecology ===
Taubatherium was herbivorous. The dental mesowear of Taubatherium strongly suggests it was a browser that fed on minimally abrasive vegetation, consistent with morphological inferences.

=== Social behaviour ===
Taubatherium was an animal with gregarious habits, who lived in herd near the ancient lake whose former basin constitutes the Tremembé Formation; specimens with notable morphological differences, probably due to ontogenesis or sexual dimorphism, were preserved in the fossil records.

== Bibliography ==
- M. F. Soria and H. M. F. Alvarenga. 1989. Nuevos restos de mamiferos de la Cuenca de Taubaté, Estado de Sao Paulo, Brasil. Anais da Academia Brasileira de Ciências 61(2):157-175
- B. J. Shockey. 2005. New leontinidids (Class Mammalia, Order Notoungulata, Family Leontiniidae) from the Salla beds of Bolivia (Deseadan, Late Oligocene). Bulletin of the Florida Museum of Natural History 45(4):249-260
