= Tremembé Formation =

- Stratigraphic range: Deseadan

Location
- Coordinates: 12.9°S 38.5°W
- Approximate paleocoordinates: 12.7°S 5.7°W
- Region: São Paulo
- Country: Brazil
- Extent: Taubaté Basin

Type section
- Named for: Tremembé
- Tremembé Formation (Brazil)

The Tremembé Formation is a major Oligocene geological formation within the Taubaté Basin of Brazil. It is notable for its fossils.

== Location ==
The Tremembé Formation located within the Taubaté Basin in the state of São Paulo.

== Geology ==
The formation is characterized by lacustrine deposits which were laid down during the Oligocene.

== Paleontology ==
The Tremembé Formation contains many fossils which are of interest to paleontologists. Fish are particularly well preserved. Among other mammals significant Sparassodonta and Proborhyaenidae finds have been made.

The formation contains the following paleofauna:

== Fossil content ==
Color key: Taxon / Reclassified taxon / Taxon falsely reported as present / Dubious taxon or junior synonym / Ichnotaxon / Ootaxon / Morphotaxon

Notes
Uncertain or tentative taxa are in small text
~~crossed out~~ taxa are discredited.

=== Amphibians ===
Indeterminate Hyloidea, with Leptodactylidae and Hylidae characteristics, pipidae interminate is also know.

Amphibians of the Tremembé Formation
Genus	Species	Location	Stratigraphic position	Material	Notes	Images
Ymboirana	Y. acrux				A thiphlonectid caecilian	

=== Birds ===
Birds of the Tremembé Formation
Genus	Species	Location	Stratigraphic position	Material	Notes	Images
Agnopterus	A. sicki				A phoenicopterid phoenicopteriform	
Ameripodius	A. silvasantosi				A quercymegapodiid pangalliform	
Brasilogyps	B. faustoid				A catharid cathartiform	
Chaunoides	C. antiquus				An anhimid anseriform	
Hoazinavis	H. lacustris				An opisthocomid opisthocomiform	
Palaeodus	P. ambiguus				A phoenicopterid phoenicopteriform	
Paraphysornis	P. brasilensis				A physornithine phorusrhacid	
Taubacrex	T. granivora				A quercymegapodiid pangalliform	
Taubatornis	T. campbelli				A teratornithid cathartiform	

=== Reptiles ===
==== Crocodylomorphs ====
Crocodylomorphs of the Tremembé Formation
Genus	Species	Location	Stratigraphic position	Material	Notes	Images
Caiman	C. tremembensis				A caimanine alligatorid	

==== Lepidosaurs ====
An inderteminate snake ophidia is know.

Lepidosaurs of the Tremembé Formation
Genus	Species	Location	Stratigraphic position	Material	Notes	Images

==== Testudines ====
Testudines of the Tremembé Formation
Genus	Species	Location	Stratigraphic position	Material	Notes	Images
Phrynops	P. geoffroanus				A side-necked turtle	

=== Fish ===
Fishes of the Tremembé Formation
Genus	Species	Location	Stratigraphic position	Material	Notes	Images
Brycon	B. alvus				A bryconine bryconid	
Cyphocharax	C. rosesi				A curimatid toothless characin	
Lignobrycon	L. ligniticus				A triportheine triportheid	
Megacheinodon	M. unicus				A cheinodontine charanid	
Plesiocurimata	P. alvarengai				A curomatid toothless characin	
Santosius	S. antiquus				A perchicthyid centrarchiform	
Steindachneridion	S. iherengi				Pimelodid siluriform	
Steindachneridion	S. silvasantosi				Pimelodid siluriform	
Taubateia	T. paraiba				Loricariid siluriform	
Tremembichthys	T. garciae				A chichlasomatin chichline	
Tremembichthys	T. pauloensis				A chichlasomatin chichline	

=== Mammals ===
==== Meridiolestidans ====
Meridiolestidans of the Tremembé Formation
Genus	Species	Location	Stratigraphic position	Material	Notes	Images

==== Meridiungulates ====
Meridiungulates of the Tremembé Formation
Genus	Species	Location	Stratigraphic position	Material	Notes	Images
Astrapotheria Indet.	Indeterminate				An astrapotheriinae notoungulate	
Rhynchippus	R. brasiliensis				A notohippid notoungulate	
Taubatherium	T. paulacoutoi				A leontiniid notoungulate	
Pyrotheriidae	Indeterminate				A pyrotheria notoungulata	
Proterotheriidae	Indeterminate				A litopterna notoungulate	
Leontiniidae	Indeterminate				A leontiniid notoungulate	

==== Xenarthrans ====
Xenarthrans of the Tremembé Formation
Genus	Species	Location	Stratigraphic position	Material	Notes	Images
Eocoelophorus	E. glyptodontoides				An armadillo	

==== Metatherians ====
Metatherians of the Tremembé Formation
Genus	Species	Location	Stratigraphic position	Material	Notes	Images
Proborhyaenidae Indet.	Indeterminate				A large Proborhyaenidae close to Thylacosmilidae	
Hathliacynidae	Indeterminate					

==== Rodents ====
Rodents of the Tremembé Formation
Genus	Species	Location	Stratigraphic position	Material	Notes	Images
Acarechimys	A. minutus				An eumysopine echimyid	
Paulacoutomys	P. paulista				An echimyid octodontoid	

==== Bats ====
Bats of the Tremembé Formation
Genus	Species	Location	Stratigraphic position	Material	Notes	Images
Mormopterus	M. faustoi				A free-tailed bat	

==== Arthropod ====
Arthropod of the Tremembé Formation
Genus	Species	Location	Stratigraphic position	Material	Notes	Images

=== Insects ===
Insect of the Tremembé Formation
Genus	Species	Location	Stratigraphic position	Material	Notes	Images
Taubaracne	T. maculosa				A spider	
