= Barbel (zoology) =

Whiskerlike sensory organ near the mouth of a fish

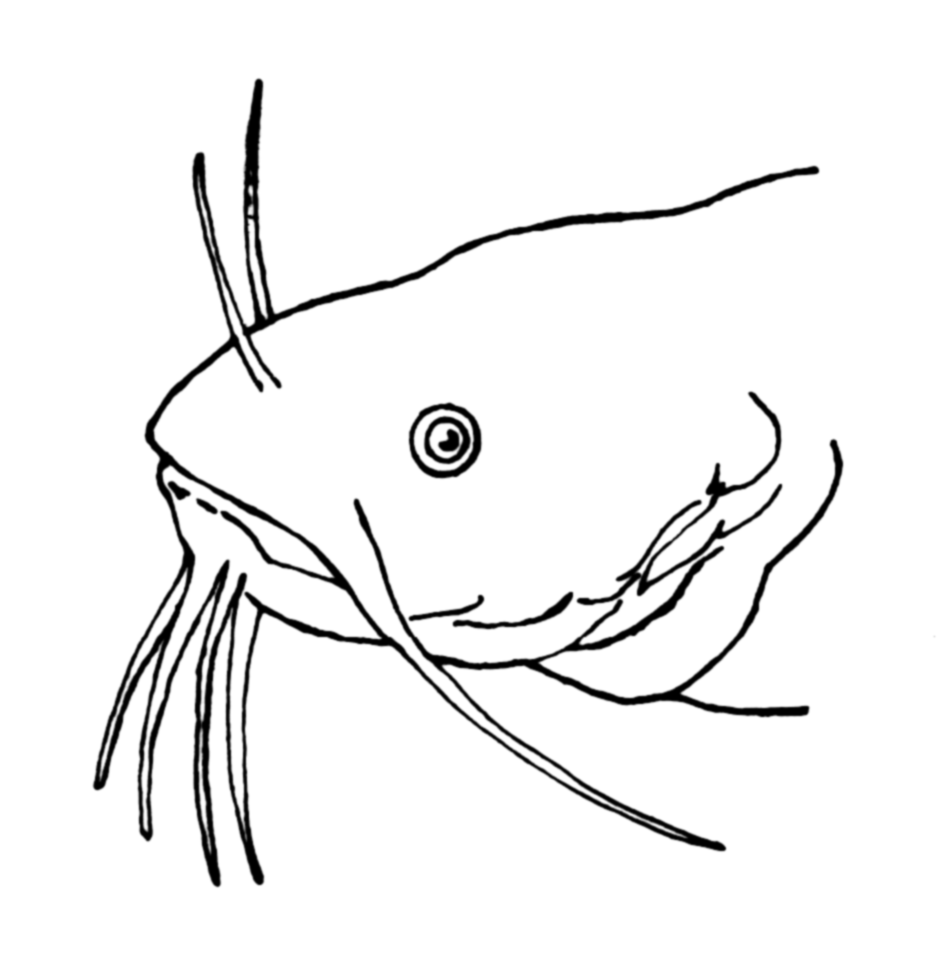
Barbel sketch

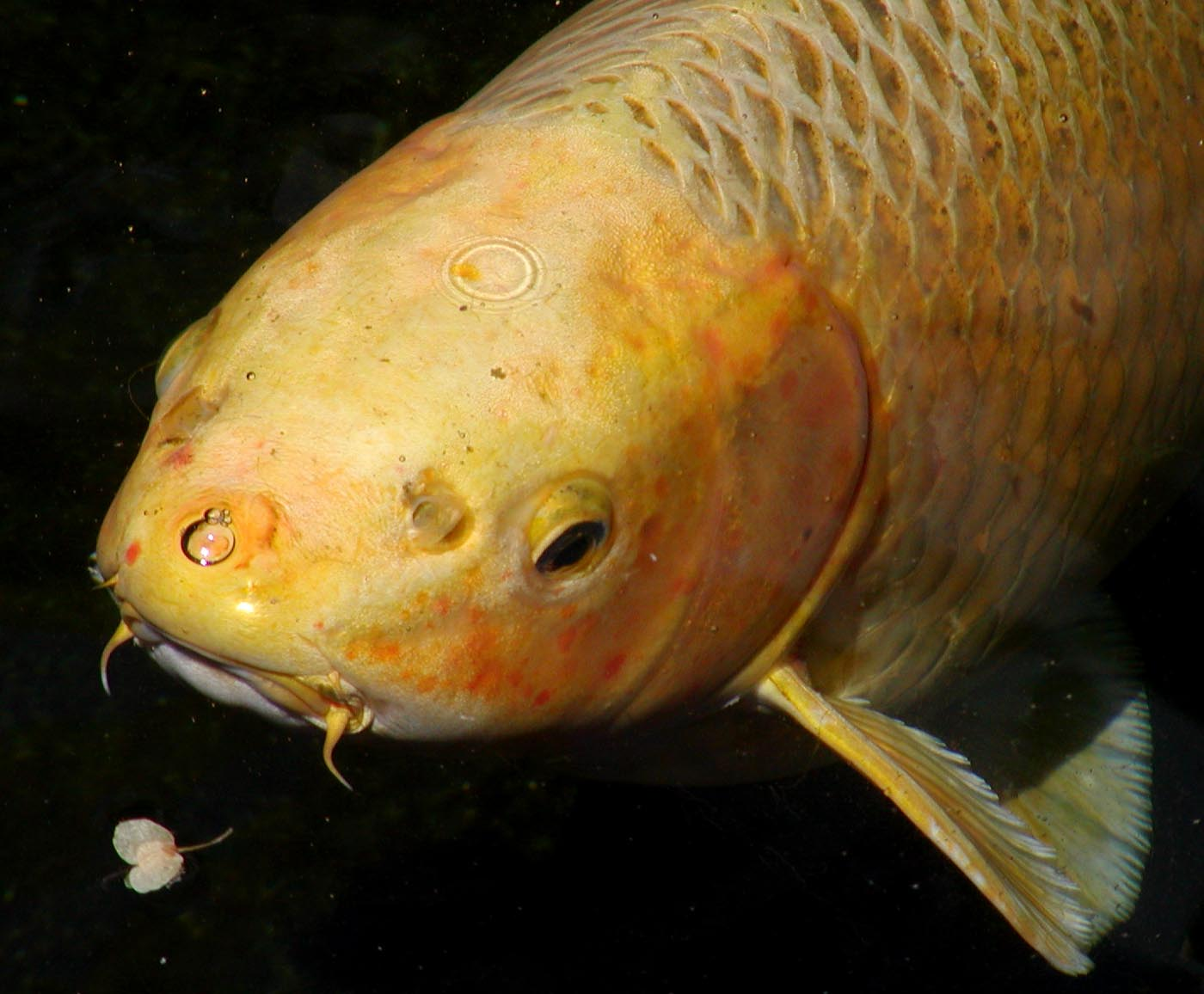
Koi carp have two pairs of barbels, the second pair being quite small.

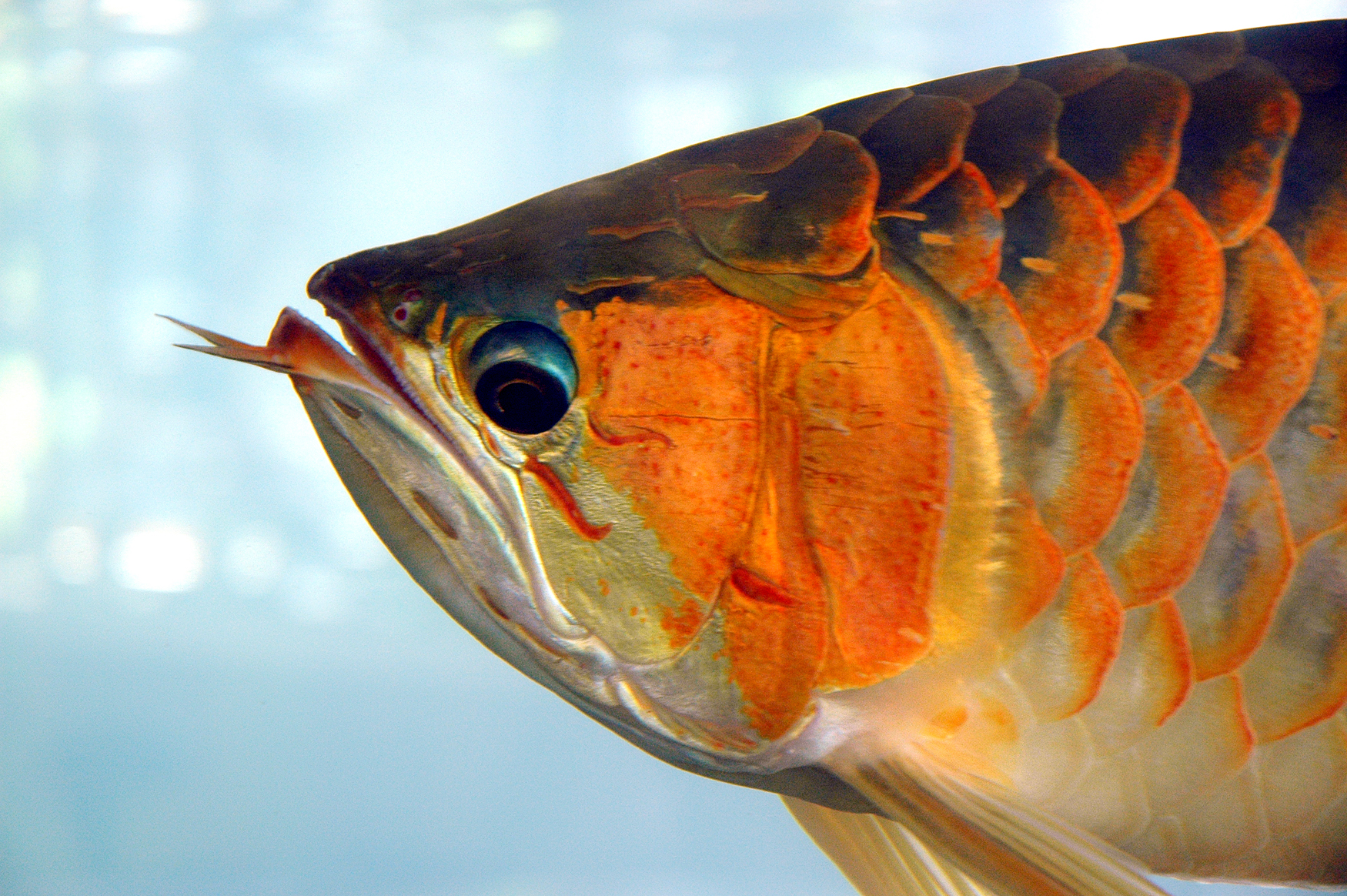
This Asian arowana has large, protruding barbels

In fish anatomy and turtle anatomy, a barbel is a slender, whisker-like sensory organ near the mouth (sometimes called whiskers or tendrils). Fish that have barbels include the catfish, the carp, the goatfish, the hagfish, the sturgeon, the zebrafish, the black dragonfish and some species of shark such as the sawshark. Barbels house the taste buds of such fish and are used to search for food in murky water.

The word barbel comes from Latin barbula 'little beard'. Barbels are sometimes erroneously referred to as barbs, which are found in bird feathers for flight.

Barbels may be located in a variety of locations on the head of a fish. "Maxillary barbels" refers to barbels on either side of the mouth. Barbels may also be nasal, extending from the nostrils. Also, barbels are often mandibular or mental, being located on the chin.

In fish, barbels can take the form of small, fleshy protrusions or long, cylindrical shaped extensions of the head of a fish. The cylindrical barbel shapes are built on an internal support system that can be made from ossified tissue or from cartilaginous connective tissue that provides a base for blood vessels and myelinated nerves to wrap around, held together in the dermis. Muscle tissue in the central region of the barbel allows the structure limited movement that aids in prey manipulation. On the epidermis, taste buds are situated on dermal papillae, small ridges of folded skin that increase the surface area of the skin and the total number of taste buds that can be concentrated on the barbel. Concentrations of taste buds vary from species to species, with bullhead catfish having 25 buds in a square millimeter of barbel skin.

Barbels begin to develop during the embryonic, larval, or juvenile life stages of most of the species in which they are present. Development regulation of barbels has been linked to the C-C motif ligand 33 of the chemokine family of genes, due to its presence in barbeled catfish and zebrafish and absence or difference in expression in barbel-less members of the same families. This class of genes are signalling genes that provide migrating cells directional information during morphogenesis.

== Function ==
In most fish species, barbels are used to aid in the acquisition of food in bodies of water that have low visibility due to low light conditions or murky waters. The taste receptors are able to detect enzymes in the water and help the fish identify if it is from a possible food source or possible sources of danger. The abyssal zone scavengers Coryphaenoides armatus possess one small mandible barbel that they use to search the seafloor for carrion to eat.

Freckled Goatfish, Upeneus tragula, develop barbels as a response to food availability. When starved of food for two days under laboratory conditions, U. tragula develop large barbels compared to those developed by those who were fed consistently. The large barbels help the organism capture prey and compete against other individuals. However, individuals that developed large barbels also experienced a decreased growth rate.

In the species Triportheus signatus, individuals have been found to develop barbels late in life as a response to low dissolved oxygen in pools left after flood waters recede following the rainy season. These structures are more vascularized than barbels of other fish species to help gas exchange in low oxygen conditions and direct more water flow over the gills.
