= Taubateia =

Taubateia paraiba Temporal range: Oligocene-Early Miocene (Deseadan) ~28.4–21.0 Ma

Scientific classification
- Kingdom: Animalia
- Phylum: Chordata
- Class: Actinopterygii
- Order: Siluriformes
- Family: Loricariidae
- Genus: †Taubateia; Malabarba & Lundberg, 2007
- Species: †T. paraiba

Binomial name
- †Taubateia paraiba Malabarba & Lundberg, 2007

Extinct genus of fishes

Taubateia paraiba was a species of catfish from the family Loricariidae. It was found in the Tremembé Formation sediments of the Taubaté Basin in eastern São Paulo State, Brazil. The genus name Taubateia comes from the name Taubate, in reference to the basin where the fossil comes from. The species name paraiba comes from the name of the river Paraíba do Sul.

It is unclear to which subfamily T. paraiba belongs. The ventral skull length is 54.5 millimetres (2.15 in).
