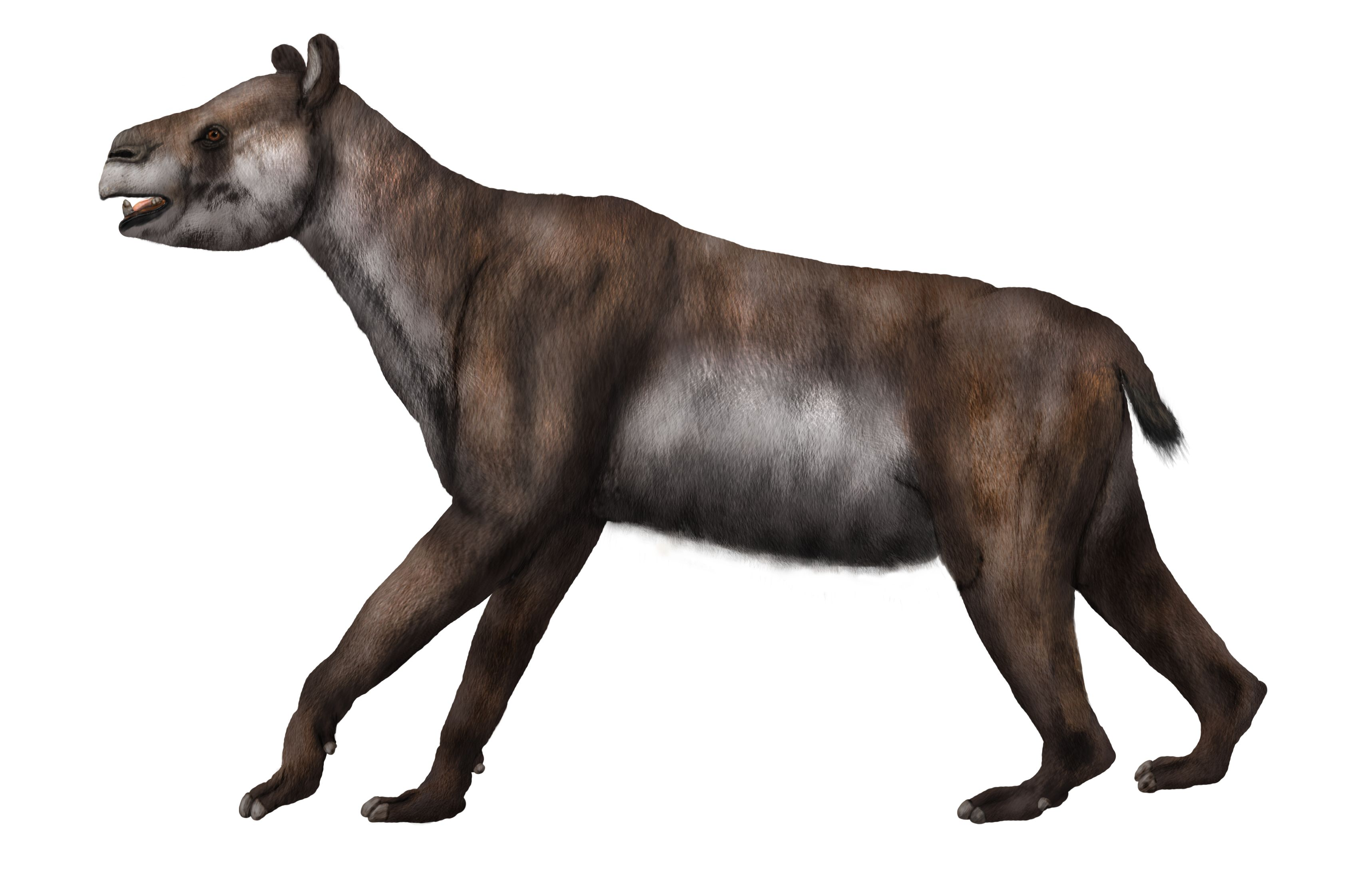
- Life reconstruction

Scientific classification
- Kingdom: Animalia
- Phylum: Chordata
- Class: Mammalia
- Order: †Notoungulata
- Family: †Leontiniidae
- Genus: †Huilatherium; Villarroel & Guerrero, 1985
- Species: †H. pluriplicatum

Binomial name
- †Huilatherium pluriplicatum Villarroel & Guerrero, 1985

Synonyms
- Laventatherium hylei Colwell, 1965 (thesis)

= Huilatherium =

Huilatherium Temporal range: Mid Miocene (Colloncuran-Laventan) ~15.9–11.8 Ma

Extinct genus of mammals

Huilatherium is an extinct genus of leontiniid, a group of hoofed mammals belonging to the order Notoungulata, that comprises other South American ungulate families that evolved in parallel with some mammals of the Northern hemisphere. The leontiinids were a family of herbivorous species comprising medium to large browsers, with relatively short skulls and robust limbs, somewhat similar to their relatives, the best known toxodontids.

== Etymology ==
The name Huilatherium means "Beast from Huila".

== Description ==
Huilatherium was discovered in Colombia, at the Konzentrat-Lagerstätte of La Venta in the Honda Group of Huila. So far, only a single species is known, H. pluriplicatum. This species was initially described based in a left maxillary deciduous teeth of a juvenile, which was reported by Jane Colwell in 1965 as a possible leontiinid, to which she applied the scientific name of Laventatherium hylei ("beast of La Venta"), but since she made her description in a master's thesis and it was never published, the authors Villarroel and Guerrero Díaz ignored this report and described the material again, this time as Huilatherium. Despite being named after Laventatherium, this is the official name since the former does not satisfy the rules of the International Commission on Zoological Nomenclature for publication of scientific names. Huilatherium lived during the Colloncuran and Laventan stages of the South American land mammal ages (SALMA), from approximately 16 to 11.8 Ma.

== Paleobiology ==
Later descriptions of the species reported additional material from adult individuals: other skull fragments, more teeth and some postcranial pieces, showing that it was an animal of up to 800 kilograms (1,800 lb), one of the largest of its kind living in the middle Miocene, about 12 million of years (in the Laventan SALMA), being specially notable for being the last and most specialized known member of his family. In the leontiinids, there is a gradual trend towards specialization of the teeth, where this is going developing more the incisors and appears a conspicuous diastema. In Huilatherium, the canine teeth are very reduced in size, reducing the number of anterior incisors and developing tusk-like incisors. These features indicate a close relationship to Taubatherium paulacoutoi, a genus from the Oligocene of Tremembé Formation in Brazil with which form a separate clade from other species of the family, that are primarily known from sites of Paleogene in Argentina and this indicate how this family was displaced to the tropical north of South America as the climate changes contribute to the disappearing of the woodland environments on which they depended to live.
