= Taubacrex =

Taubacrex Temporal range: Late Oligocene-Early Miocene (Deseadan) ~23 Ma

Scientific classification
- Kingdom: Animalia
- Phylum: Chordata
- Class: Aves
- Family: †Quercymegapodiidae
- Genus: †Taubacrex; Alvarenga 1988
- Species: †T. granivora

Binomial name
- †Taubacrex granivora Alvarenga 1988

Extinct genus of birds

Taubacrex is an extinct genus of birds of the family Quercymegapodiidae from the Late Oligocene to Early Miocene (Deseadan) Tremembé Formation of the Taubaté Basin in the state of São Paulo, Brazil. The type species is Taubacrex granivora. In the original description, Herculano Alvarenga classified it as a member of family Rallidae. It provides the earliest fossil record of gastroliths in birds of the order Galliformes.
