= Taubaté Basin =

Sedimentary basin in São Paulo, Brazil

The Taubaté basin is a sedimentary basin located in the Brazilian state of São Paulo.

== Location ==
The Taubaté Basin is located in the state of São Paulo. It is within the São Paulo portion of the Paraíba Valley.

== Tremembé formation ==
The Tremembé Formation is a geologic formation within the Taubaté Basin. The Tremembé Formation contains many fossils which were laid down during the Oligocene. Fish are particularly well preserved.

== See also ==
- Taubaté
- Taubateia
- Taubatornis
- Taubacrex
