= Clupeacharacinae =

Scientific classification
- Kingdom: Animalia
- Phylum: Chordata
- Class: Actinopterygii
- Order: Characiformes
- Family: Triportheidae
- Subfamily: Clupeacharacinae; Fowler, 1958

Genera
- See text

Subfamily of fishes

Clupeacharacinae, the herring characins, is a subfamily of freshwater ray-finned fishes belonging to the family Triportheidae, the hatchet characins or keeled characins. The fishes in this subfamily are found in South America.

== Genera ==
Clupeacharacinae has the following genera classified within it:

- Clupeacharax Pearson, 1924
- Engraulisoma Castro, 1981
