= Jacques Felix =

Explorer and pioneer of Brazil

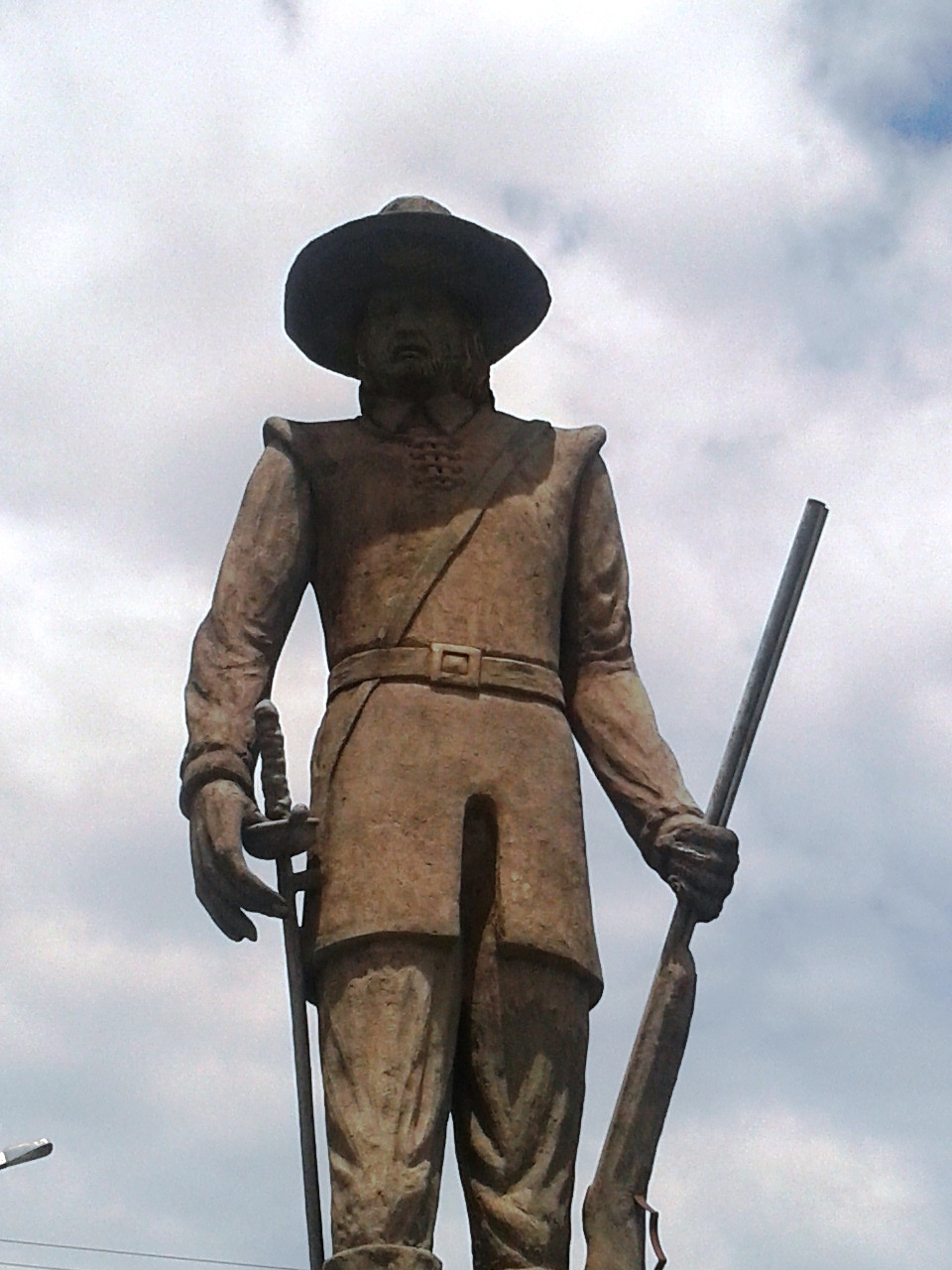
Jacques Felix

Captain-major Jacques Felix was an explorer and pioneer of Brazil. Felix was a wealthy resident of São Paulo, who in 1836 was given permission to expand the lands of the Countess of Vimieiro. There, he established a settlement which would become the city of Taubaté.
