= Clupeacharax =

Conservation status
- Least Concern (IUCN 3.1)

Scientific classification
- Kingdom: Animalia
- Phylum: Chordata
- Class: Actinopterygii
- Order: Characiformes
- Family: Triportheidae
- Subfamily: Clupeacharacinae
- Genus: Clupeacharax; N. E. Pearson, 1924
- Species: C. anchoveoides

Binomial name
- Clupeacharax anchoveoides N. E. Pearson, 1924

Monospecific genus of fish

Clupeacharax is a monospecific genus of freshwater ray-finned fish belonging to the family Triportheidae, the hatchet characins or keeled characins. The only species in this genus is Clupeacharax anchoveoides. This species is found in South America in the upper Amazon basin, and in the basins of the Paraná and Paraguay Rivers. This genus is one of two genera within the subfamily Clupeacharacinae.
