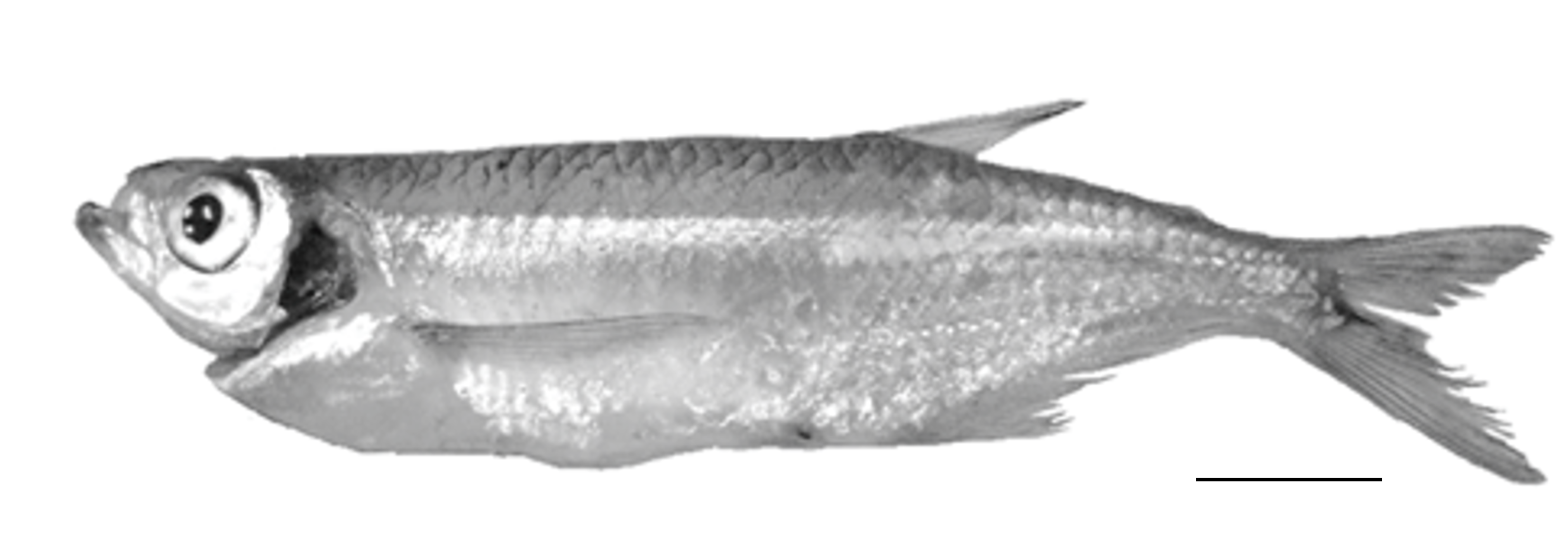
- Specimen of L. myersi

Scientific classification
- Kingdom: Animalia
- Phylum: Chordata
- Class: Actinopterygii
- Division: Teleostei
- Order: Characiformes
- Family: Triportheidae
- Subfamily: Triportheinae
- Genus: Lignobrycon; C. H. Eigenmann & G. S. Myers, 1929

Type species
- †Lignobrycon ligniticus Woodward, 1898

Synonyms
- Moojenichthys P. Miranda-Ribeiro, 1956

= Lignobrycon =

Lignobrycon Temporal range: Oligocene to present

Genus of fish

Lignobrycon is a genus of freshwater ray-finned fishes belonging to the family Triportheidae, the hatchet characins. This genus contains one known extant species, L. myersi, and one, or more, extinct species. The fishes in this genus are found in South America.

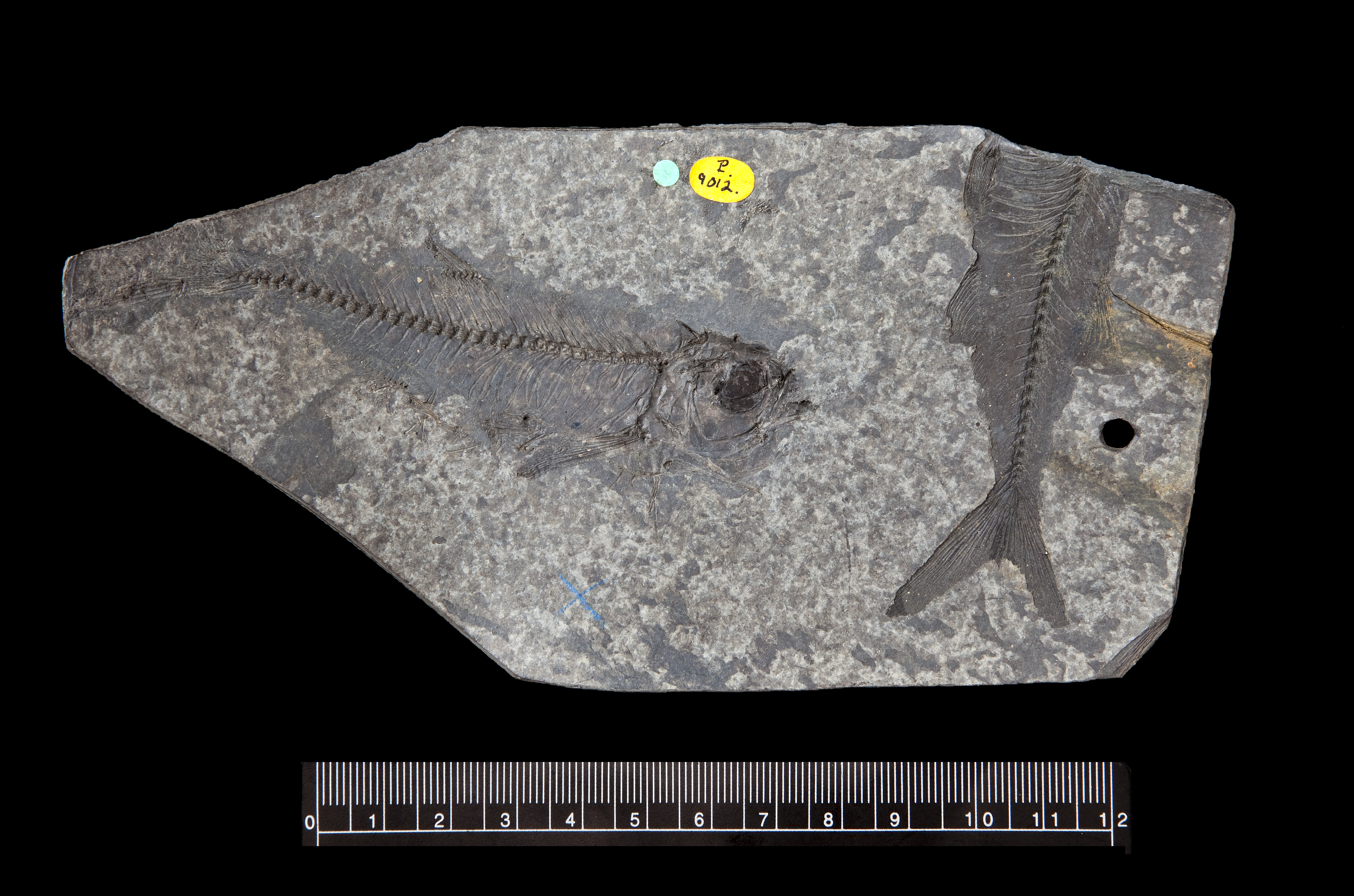
Fossil specimens of Lignobrycon ligniticus

A fossil species is also known, †Lignobrycon ligniticus (Woodward, 1898), from the Oligocene-aged Tremembé Formation of Brazil. This species was actually the first described member of the genus, and was recovered from lignite deposits, hence the name Lignobrycon. It was only after the description of the fossil L. ligniticus that the extant L. myersi was identified, being described in the genus Moojenichthys. In 1998, the relationship between the fossil and extant species was identified, and L. myersi was also moved to the genus Lignobrycon, making the genus extant once again.

== Species ==
Ligbobrycon contains the following species:

- †Lignobrycon altus (Santos, 1946)
- †Lignobrycon ligniticus Woodward, 1898
- Lignobrycon myersi (P. Miranda-Ribeiro, 1956)

A second potential fossil species, †Lignobrycon altus (Santos, 1946), has also been identified from Late Pliocene/Early Pleistocene-aged shales of Brazil, but these remains are poorly preserved and it may not even represent a characiform.
