= Engraulisoma =

Conservation status
- Least Concern (IUCN 3.1)

Scientific classification
- Kingdom: Animalia
- Phylum: Chordata
- Class: Actinopterygii
- Order: Characiformes
- Family: Triportheidae
- Subfamily: Clupeacharacinae
- Genus: Engraulisoma; R. M. C. Castro, 1981
- Species: E. taeniatum

Binomial name
- Engraulisoma taeniatum R. M. C. Castro, 1981

Monospecific genus of fish

Engraulisoma is a monospecific genus of freshwater ray-finned fish belonging to the family Triportheidae, the hatchet characins or keeled characins. The only species in this genus is Engraulisoma taeniatum. This species is found in South America and has been recorded from Bolivia, Brazil, Colombia, Ecuador, Guyana, Peru and Venezuela in the Amazon, Araguaia-Tocantins, upper-Paraguay, Napo and Orinoco River basins. This genus is one of two genera within the subfamily Clupeacharacinae.
