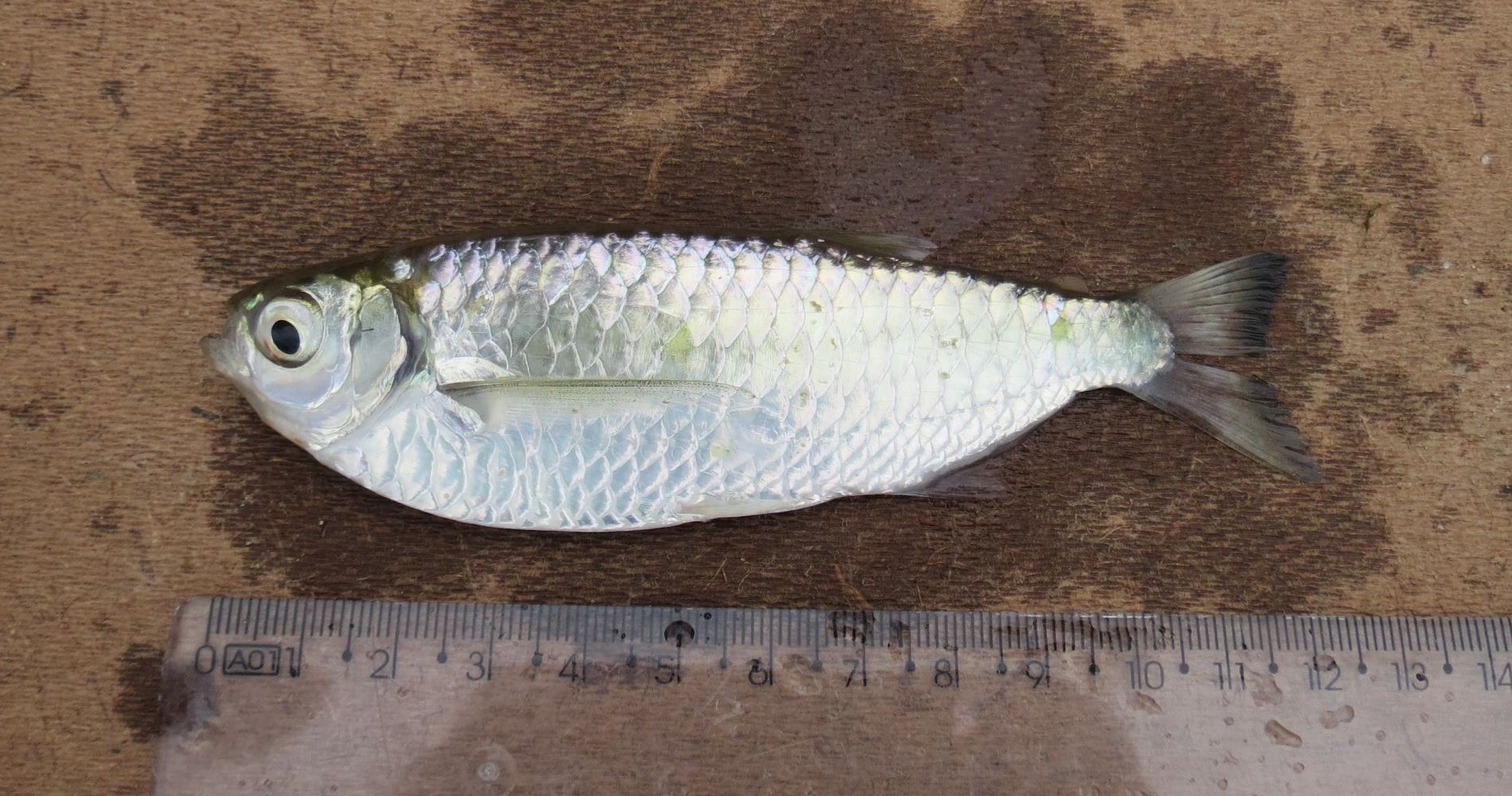
- Triportheus albus, the type species of Triportheus

Scientific classification
- Kingdom: Animalia
- Phylum: Chordata
- Class: Actinopterygii
- Order: Characiformes
- Family: Triportheidae
- Subfamily: Triportheinae; Fowler, 1940

Genera
- See text

= Triportheinae =

Subfamily of fishes

Triportheinae is a subfamily of freshwater ray-finned fishes belonging to the family Triportheidae, the hatchet characins or keeled characins. The fishes in this subfamily are found in South America.

== Genera ==
Triportheinae has the following genera classified within it:

- Lignobrycon C. H. Eigenmann & G. S. Myers, 1929
- Triportheus Cope, 1872

The genus Lignonrycon is classified in this subfamily by some authorities, but others classify it in the subfamily Agoniatinae.
