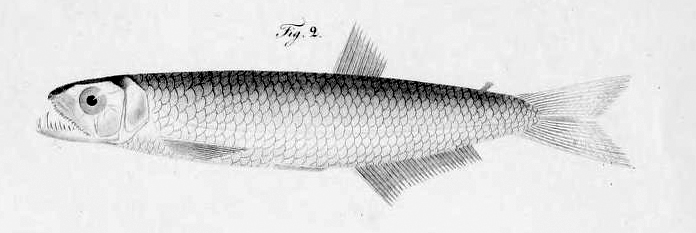
- Agoniates halecinus

Scientific classification
- Kingdom: Animalia
- Phylum: Chordata
- Class: Actinopterygii
- Order: Characiformes
- Family: Triportheidae
- Subfamily: Agoniatinae; Bleeker, 1859
- Genus: Agoniates; J. P. Müller & Troschel, 1845

Type species
- Agoniates halecinus J. P. Müller & Troschel, 1845

= Agoniates =

Genus of fishes

Agoniates is genus of freshwater ray-finned fishes belonging to the family Triportheidae, the hatchet characins or keeled characins. The fishes in this genus are found in tropical South America. It is the only genus in the subfamily Agoniatinae.

The genus Lignobrycon is classified in the subfamily Triportheinae by some authorities, but others classify it in this subfamily.

== Species ==
There are currently two recognized species in this genus:

- Agoniates anchovia C. H. Eigenmann, 1914
- Agoniates halecinus J. P. Müller & Troschel, 1845
