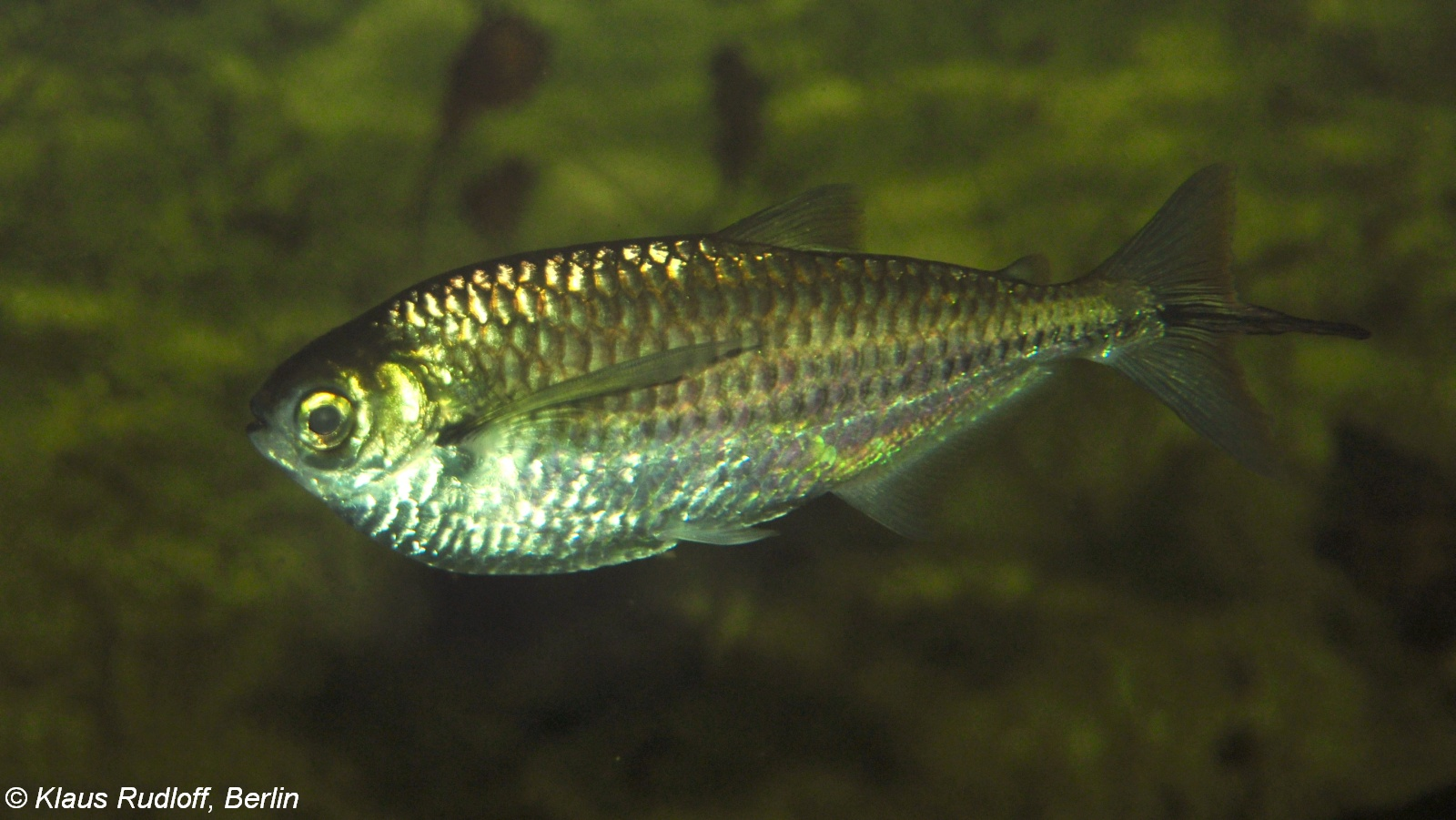
- Triportheus angulatus

Scientific classification
- Kingdom: Animalia
- Phylum: Chordata
- Class: Actinopterygii
- Division: Teleostei
- Order: Characiformes
- Suborder: Characoidei
- Family: Triportheidae; Fowler, 1940

Subfamilies and genera
- See text

= Triportheidae =

Triportheidae Temporal range: Oligocene to present

Family of ray-finned fishes

Triportheidae, the hatchet characins, is a family of characiform fishes, including about 23 species. This family was raised from the status of a subfamily to family based on extensive analysis of characiform species.

Fossils of this group date back to the Oligocene, with the fossil species †Lignobrycon ligniticus (Woodward, 1898) from Brazil.

== Taxonomy ==
The following genera are placed in this family:

- Family Triportheidae Fowler, 1940
  - Subfamily Triportheinae Fowler, 1940 (keeled characines)
    - Genus Lignobrycon C. H. Eigenmann & Myers, 1929 (=Moojenichthys Miranda-Ribeiro, 1956)
    - Genus Triportheus Cope, 1872
  - Subfamily Agoniatinae Bleeker, 1859 (anchovy characines)
    - Genus Agoniates Müller & Troschel, 1845
  - Subfamily Clupeacharacinae Fowler, 1958 (herring characines)
    - Genus Clupeacharax Pearson, 1924
    - Genus Engraulisoma Castro, 1981

The following cladogram is based on a time-calibrated phylogenetic tree using genetics:

- - Triportheidae
    - - - - - Agoniates
            - Clupeacharax
        - Engraulisoma
      - Triportheus
    - Lignobrycon
  - Bryconidae
- Gasteropelecidae
