= Taubaté =

Place in southeastern Brazil

- Municipality
- Municipality of Taubaté
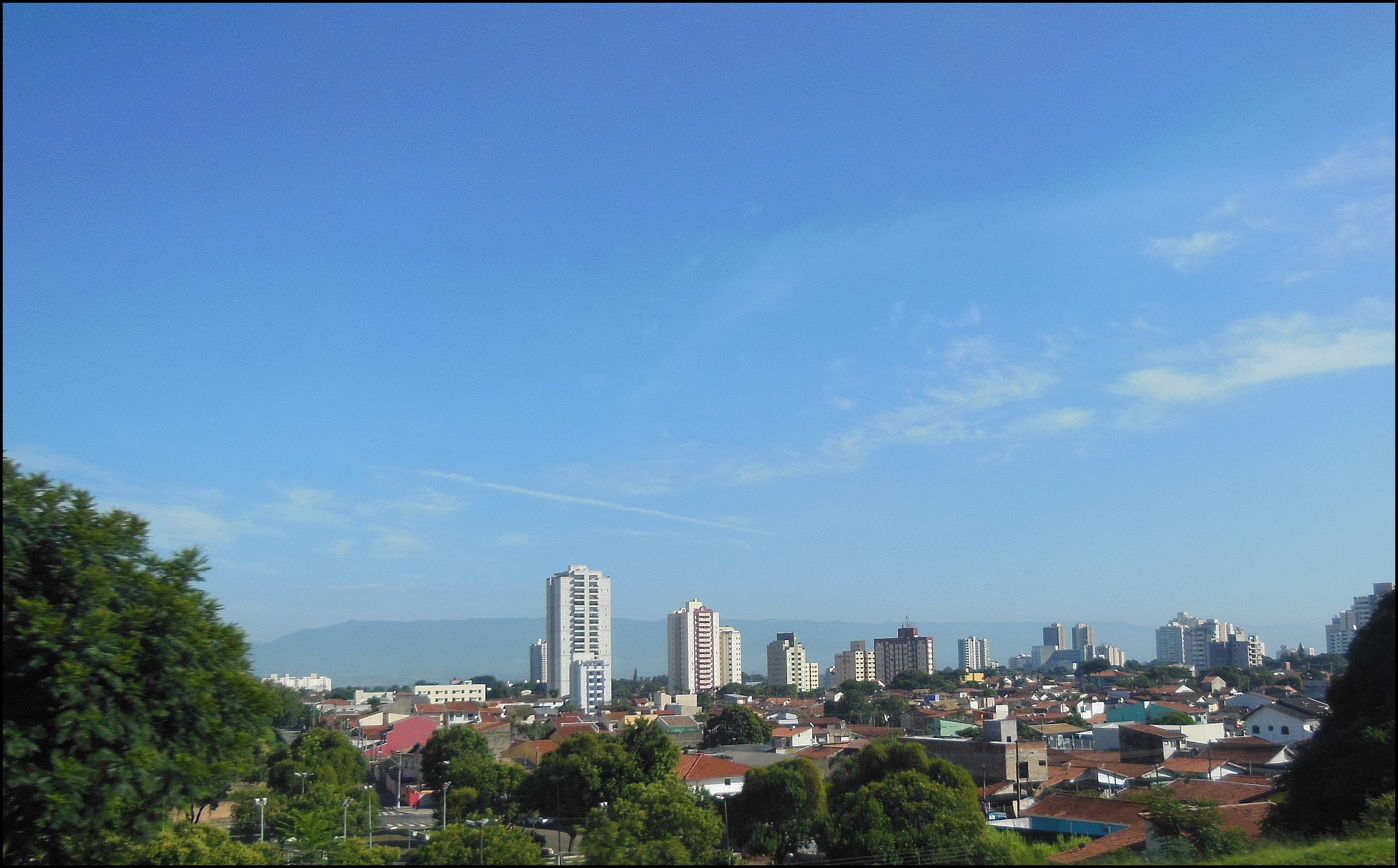

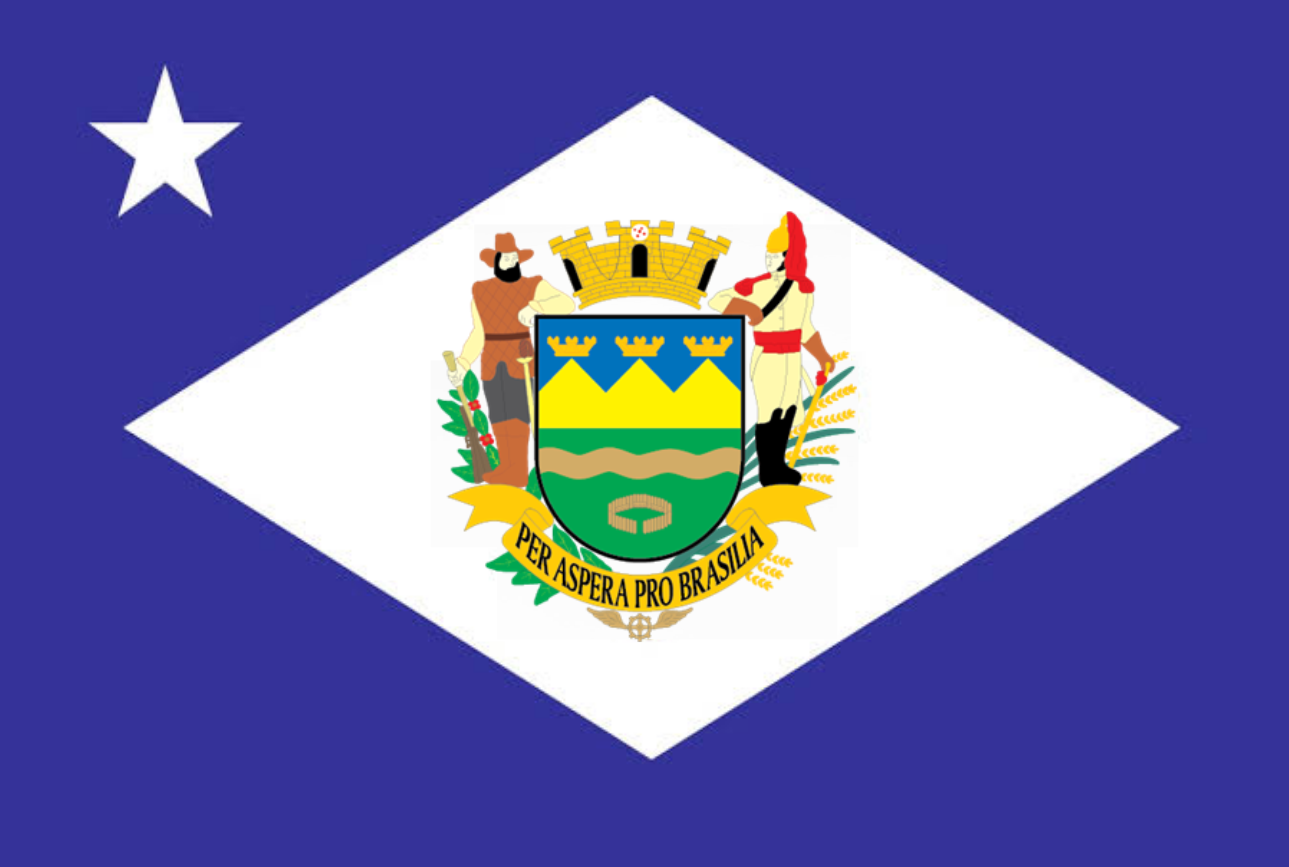
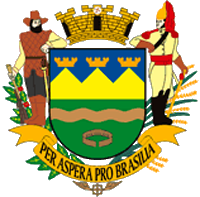
- Flag Coat of arms
- Nickname: Capital Nacional da Literatura Infantil
- Motto: Per aspera pro Brasilia "All sacrifice for Brazil"
- Location in the state of São Paulo and Brazil

- Location in Brazil
- Coordinates: 23°01′30″S 45°33′20″W
- Country: Brazil
- Region: Southeast
- State: São Paulo
- Settled: December 5, 1645

Government
  - Mayor: Sérgio Victor (NOVO, 2025 – 2028)

Area
  - Total: 625.00 km^{2} (241.31 sq mi)

Population (2025)
  - Total: 322,397
  - Density: 515.84/km^{2} (1,336.0/sq mi)
- Time zone: UTC−3 (BRT)
- Postal code: 12000-000
- Area code: +55 12
- HDI (2010): 0.800 – very high
- Website: taubate.sp.gov.br

Taubaté is a medium-sized city in the state of São Paulo, in Paraíba Valley southeastern Brazil. The city that was established in the early 17th century, by Jacques Félixis, is home for an estimated population of 250,000 people, living between São Paulo to Rio de Janeiro.

== History ==
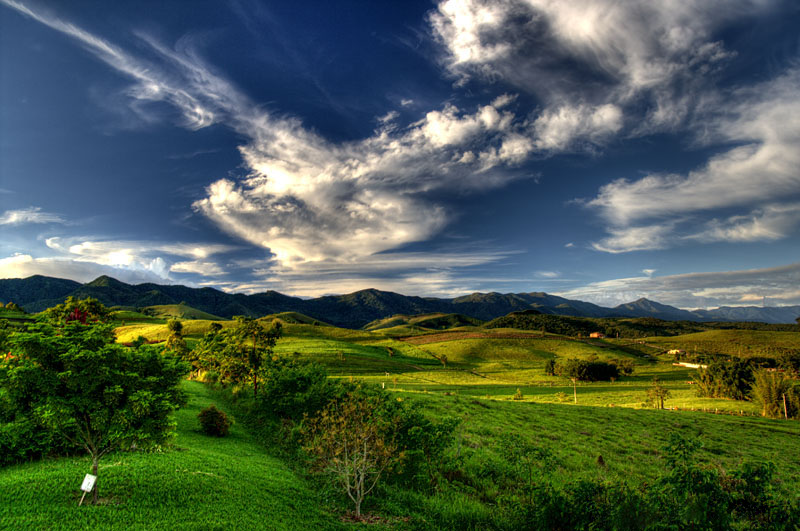
Hills and fields surround Taubate.

Taubaté was part of the ancient Tupinambá Territory, along the Paraíba do Sul River. The Tupinambá Territory in the 16th century, stretched from the Juqueriquerê River on the shores of Caraguatatuba to the Cape of Saint Thomas (Cabo de São Tomé) in the State of Rio de Janeiro. The first village was created in 1640 being proclaimed as an autonomous locality on December 5, 1645, by a pioneer named Jacques Felix. It was the first location in the Vale do Paraíba region to obtain autonomy. The locality got its current city status in 1842, by which time it was a coffee production center. It hosted Taubaté's Agreement in 1906. In 1908 the city was made the seat of the Roman Catholic Diocese of Taubaté. In 1900 it was the largest city in the interior of São Paulo.

The county name comes from the Guarani language and means high village (taba ybaté).

== Geography ==
=== Location ===
Its strategic location between the two most important Brazilian cities (São Paulo 123 kilometres (76 miles) away, and Rio de Janeiro 280 kilometres (170 miles) away), connected to both by the Presidente Dutra Highway, between high, cold mountains and the Atlantic Ocean has helped the development of the city. It is part of the Metropolitan Region of Vale do Paraíba e Litoral Norte. The population is 317,915 (2020 est.) in an area of 625.00 square kilometres (241.31 square miles). The city has become an industrial center, seating branches of several companies, including Volkswagen, Alstom, LG, Embraer, among many others.

A traditional city in São Paulo state, it played an important role in the historical and economic development of the country. In the gold cycle was radiating center of bandeirismo discovering gold in Minas Gerais, founding several cities. In the Second Empire, during the coffee boom of the Paraíba Valley, has emerged as the largest municipality in the state production area, hosting the Taubaté Convention in 1906.

The municipality contains part of the 292,000-hectare (720,000-acre) Mananciais do Rio Paraíba do Sul Environmental Protection Area, created in 1982 to protect the sources of the Paraíba do Sul river.

=== Climate ===
The climate is classified as a humid subtropical climate, under the Köppen climate classification with the average annual temperature around 21 °C (69 °F), with a maximum of 19 °C (66 °F) and a minimum of 10 °C (50 °F). The average humidity is 60% and the annual rainfall is 1,397 millimetres (55 in). The most extreme temperatures recorded in the city are 1 °C (33 °F) and 40.1 °C (104 °F).

Climate data for Taubaté, elevation 577 m (1,893 ft), (1981–2010 normals, extremes 1961–1977, 1992–present)
Month	Jan	Feb	Mar	Apr	May	Jun	Jul	Aug	Sep	Oct	Nov	Dec	Year
Record high °C (°F)	38.1 (100.6)	40.1 (104.2)	36.2 (97.2)	34.2 (93.6)	32.6 (90.7)	31.0 (87.8)	32.1 (89.8)	35.6 (96.1)	37.8 (100.0)	40.0 (104.0)	37.4 (99.3)	37.5 (99.5)	40.1 (104.2)
Mean daily maximum °C (°F)	30.6 (87.1)	31.2 (88.2)	30.1 (86.2)	28.5 (83.3)	25.4 (77.7)	24.7 (76.5)	24.9 (76.8)	26.7 (80.1)	27.3 (81.1)	29.0 (84.2)	29.5 (85.1)	30.4 (86.7)	28.2 (82.8)
Daily mean °C (°F)	23.8 (74.8)	23.9 (75.0)	23.0 (73.4)	21.4 (70.5)	18.1 (64.6)	16.5 (61.7)	16.4 (61.5)	17.8 (64.0)	19.6 (67.3)	21.5 (70.7)	22.3 (72.1)	23.3 (73.9)	20.6 (69.1)
Mean daily minimum °C (°F)	19.4 (66.9)	19.1 (66.4)	18.6 (65.5)	16.6 (61.9)	13.0 (55.4)	10.9 (51.6)	10.7 (51.3)	11.5 (52.7)	14.1 (57.4)	16.3 (61.3)	17.3 (63.1)	18.5 (65.3)	15.5 (59.9)
Record low °C (°F)	10.9 (51.6)	12.6 (54.7)	11.6 (52.9)	5.4 (41.7)	4.2 (39.6)	1.1 (34.0)	0.9 (33.6)	2.6 (36.7)	3.8 (38.8)	7.8 (46.0)	8.6 (47.5)	11.0 (51.8)	0.9 (33.6)
Average precipitation mm (inches)	238.1 (9.37)	197.3 (7.77)	163.6 (6.44)	78.6 (3.09)	55.8 (2.20)	26.7 (1.05)	37.9 (1.49)	26.4 (1.04)	79.6 (3.13)	118.2 (4.65)	160.7 (6.33)	178.0 (7.01)	1,360.9 (53.58)
Average precipitation days (≥ 1.0 mm)	18	14	13	7	6	4	4	3	8	10	12	15	114
Average relative humidity (%)	79.9	79.3	79.9	78.9	80.0	79.7	77.5	72.8	74.1	74.0	75.2	76.6	77.3
Mean monthly sunshine hours	148.9	154.3	158.4	178.6	171.6	179.3	183.6	197.7	137.0	147.1	152.2	162.6	1,971.3
Source: Instituto Nacional de Meteorologia

== Demographics ==
Male: 120,288; Female: 123,819; Urban: 229,810; Rural: 14,297; Total: 244,107 (Source: Censo 2000 - IBGE)

== Education and literature ==
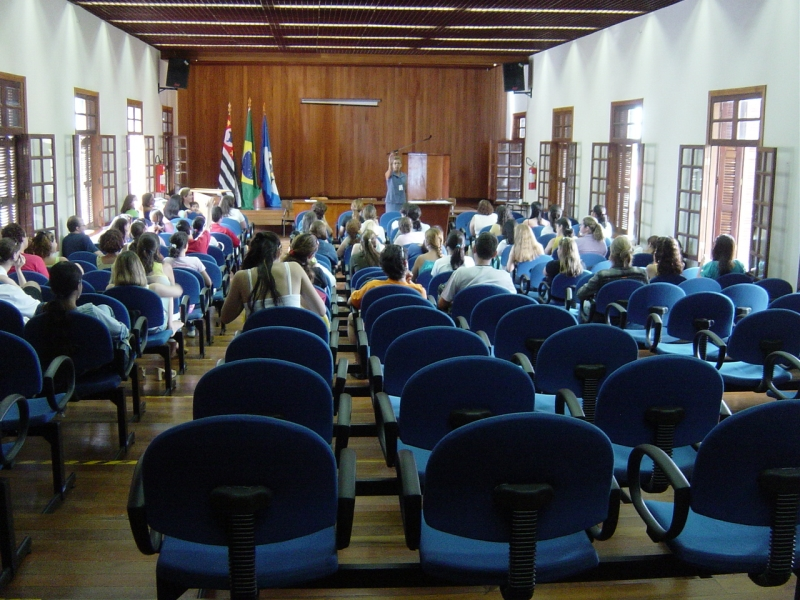
Inside a class room of the University of Taubaté

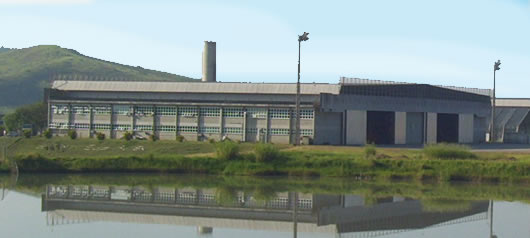
Taubaté is home to a large Brazilian Army Aviation base.

Taubaté is also a university city. The University of Taubaté, UNITAU, is a municipal institution of higher learning run by the state, but also by the private initiative. UNITAU is not free. It has schools of medicine, law, dentistry, engineering, and Business Management, and a Department of Architecture.

Monteiro Lobato, an important Portuguese-language writer of children's literature, was born in Taubaté. On 6 January 2010, the Chamber of Deputies granted Taubaté was granted the title of National Capital of Children's literature.

Amácio Mazzaropi, a pioneer in the movie industry, was born in the city to Italian immigrants.

== Sports ==
Esporte Clube Taubaté is a football club based in the city. The main competition played by the club is the Campeonato Paulista Série A2, the second level of the São Paulo state professional football championship.

== Quality of life ==
Taubaté has been ranked by the UNDP (United Nations Development Programme) the 21st out of 645 cities in the state in terms of quality of life (such as safety, public schools, medical and dental care, public transport, low air pollution, sewers, and piped water reaching all houses).

== Twin towns – sister cities ==
Taubaté is twinned with:

- Yonezawa, Japan
- Wolfsburg, Germany
- Tupungato Department, Argentina

== See also ==
- List of municipalities in São Paulo
- Taubaté Basin
