= 1989 in paleontology =

Paleontology or palaeontology is the study of prehistoric life forms on Earth through the examination of plant and animal fossils. This includes the study of body fossils, tracks (ichnites), burrows, cast-off parts, fossilised feces (coprolites), palynomorphs and chemical residues. Because humans have encountered fossils for millennia, paleontology has a long history both before and after becoming formalized as a science. This article records significant discoveries and events related to paleontology that occurred or were published in the year 1989.

== Plants ==
=== Angiosperms ===
==== Nymphaeales ====
Name	Novelty	Status	Authors	Age	Unit	Location	Synonymized taxa	Notes	Images
Allenbya	Gen et sp nov	valid	Cevallos-Ferriz & Stockey	Eocene; Ypresian	Eocene Okanagan Highlands; Princeton Chert	Canada; British Columbia		A permineralized waterlily genus The type species is A. collinsonae Not to be confused with the odonate Allenbya from the Allenby Formation.	

== Arthropods ==
=== Insects ===
==== Dipterans ====
Name	Novelty	Status	Authors	Age	Unit	Location	Notes	Images
Empis orapaensis	Sp nov		Waters	Cretaceous; Turonian	Orapa Formation	Botswana	A dance fly fly.	
Pseudoacarterus	Gen et sp nov		Waters	Cretaceous; Turonian	Orapa Formation	Botswana	A hybotine fly. The type species is P. orapaensis	

==== Hemiptera ====
Name	Novelty	Status	Authors	Age	Unit	Location	Notes	Images
Penaphis woollardi	Sp nov		Jarzembowski	Cretaceous; Hauterivian	Weald Clay	England	A gymnosperm feeding aphid	

==== Hymenoptera ====
Name	Novelty	Status	Authors	Age	Unit	Location	Notes	Images
Alloiomma	Gen et sp. nov	valid	Zhang	Miocene	Shanwang Formation	China	A dolichoderine ant The type species is A. changweiensis	
Aphaenogaster lapidescens	Sp. nov	jr synonym	Zhang	Miocene	Shanwang Formation	China	A myrmicine ant Moved to Paraphaenogaster lapidescens (2014)	
Aphaenogaster paludosa	Sp. nov	jr synonym	Zhang	Miocene	Shanwang Formation	China	A myrmicine ant genus Moved to Paraphaenogaster paludosa (2014)	
Camponotus ambon	Sp. nov	valid	Zhang	Miocene	Shanwang Formation	China	A camponotine formicine ant.	
Camponotus ampullosus	Sp. nov	valid	Zhang	Miocene	Shanwang Formation	China	A camponotine formicine ant.	
Camponotus curviansatus	Sp. nov	valid	Zhang	Miocene	Shanwang Formation	China	A camponotine formicine ant.	
Camponotus gracilis	Sp. nov	valid	Zhang	Miocene	Shanwang Formation	China	A camponotine formicine ant.	
Camponotus longus	Sp. nov	valid	Zhang	Miocene	Shanwang Formation	China	A camponotine formicine ant.	
Camponotus microthoracus	Sp. nov	valid	Zhang	Miocene	Shanwang Formation	China	A camponotine formicine ant.	
Camponotus plenus	Sp. nov	valid	Zhang	Miocene	Shanwang Formation	China	A camponotine formicine ant.	
Dolichoderus evolans	Sp. nov	valid	Zhang	Miocene	Shanwang Formation	China	A dolichoderine ant.	
Dolichoderus lacinius	Sp. nov	valid	Zhang	Miocene	Shanwang Formation	China	A dolichoderine ant.	
Elaphrodites	Gen et sp. nov	valid	Zhang	Miocene	Shanwang Formation	China	A dolichoderine ant The type species is E. scutulatus Also includes E. mutatus	
Euponera minutansata	Sp. nov	jr synonym	Zhang	Miocene	Shanwang Formation	China	A ponerine ant. Moved to Pachycondyla minutansata (2014)	
Euponera nubeculata	Sp. nov	jr synonym	Zhang	Miocene	Shanwang Formation	China	A ponerine ant. Moved to Pachycondyla nubeculata (2014)	
Formica ceps	Sp. nov	valid	Zhang	Miocene	Shanwang Formation	China	A formicine ant.	
Formica linquensis	Sp. nov	valid	Zhang	Miocene	Shanwang Formation	China	A formicine ant.	
Formica ovala	Sp. nov	valid	Zhang	Miocene	Shanwang Formation	China	A formicine ant.	
Heteromyrmex	Gen et sp. nov	jr homonym	Zhang	Miocene	Shanwang Formation	China	A myrmicine ant The type species is H. atopogaster Jr homonym of Heteromyrmex Wheeler (1920); Renamed Zhangidris (2003)	
Iridomyrmex shandongicus	Sp. nov	valid	Zhang	Miocene	Shanwang Formation	China	A leptomyrmecine ant. Heterick and Shattuck (2011) considered unidentifiable.	
Lasius mordicus	Sp. nov	valid	Zhang	Miocene	Shanwang Formation	China	A lasiine ant.	
Lasius validus	Sp. nov	valid	Zhang	Miocene	Shanwang Formation	China	A lasiine ant.	
Lasius validus	Sp. nov	valid	Zhang	Miocene	Shanwang Formation	China	A lasiine ant.	
Leptogenys lacerata	Sp. nov	valid	Zhang	Miocene	Shanwang Formation	China	A ponerine ant.	
Liometopum eremicum	Sp. nov	valid	Zhang	Miocene	Shanwang Formation	China	A tapinomine ant.	
Liometopum potamophilum	Sp. nov	valid	Zhang	Miocene	Shanwang Formation	China	A tapinomine ant.	
Miosolenopsis	Gen et sp. nov	valid	Zhang	Miocene	Shanwang Formation	China	A myrmicine ant genus The type species is M. fossilis	
Myopopone sinensis	Sp. nov	valid	Zhang	Miocene	Shanwang Formation	China	A amblyoponine ant.	
Shanwangella	Gen et sp. nov	valid	Zhang	Miocene	Shanwang Formation	China	A formicine ant genus The type species is S. palaeoptera Considered a jr synonym of Camponotus (2000); Resurrected as valid (2022)	
Tapinoma baculum	Sp. nov	valid	Zhang	Miocene	Shanwang Formation	China	A tapinomine ant.	
Technomyrmex septentrionalis	Sp. nov	valid	Zhang	Miocene	Shanwang Formation	China	A tapinomine ant.	
Tylolasius	Gen et sp. nov	valid	Zhang	Miocene	Shanwang Formation	China	A formicine ant genus The type species is T. inflatus Deemed a jr synonym of Lasius (2001)	

==== Mecoptera ====
Name	Novelty	Status	Authors	Age	Unit	Location	Notes	Images
Holcorpidae	Fam nov	valid	Willmann	Eocene; Priabonian	Florissant Formation	USA; Colorado	A scorpionfly family, The type genus is Holcorpa; The type species is H. maculosa	Holcorpa maculosa

== Conodonts ==
German paleontologist and stratigrapher Heinz Walter Kozur (1942-2013) described the conodont genus Mesogondolella.

== Sauropterygians ==
=== Plesiosaurs ===
Name	Status	Authors	Notes
Turneria	Preoccupied	Chatterjee Small	preoccupied by the ant genus Turneria Forel, 1895; renamed Morturneria(1994)

==== Plesiosaur research ====
- Plesiosaur gastroliths documented.

== Archosauriformes ==
=== Archosauromorphs ===
==== Pseudosuchians ====
Name	Status	Authors	Age	Unit	Location	Notes	Images
Revueltosaurus	Valid non-dinosaurian taxon	Hunt	Late Triassic (early-middle Norian)	Bull Canyon Formation; Petrified Forest Member	United States	A suchian.	

==== Non avian dinosaurs ====
Data courtesy of George Olshevsky's dinosaur genera list.

Name	Status	Authors		Age	Unit	Location	Notes	Images
Abrosaurus	Valid taxon	Ouyang		Middle Jurassic (Bathonian-Callovian)	Xiashaximiao Formation	China	A macronarian.	Abrosaurus
Asiaceratops	Valid taxon	Lev A. Nesov and Kaznyshkina vide: Lev A. Nesov; Kaznyshkina	Cherepanov	Late Cretaceous (Cenomanian)	Khodzhakul Formation	Uzbekistan	A leptoceratopsid.	
Atlascopcosaurus	Valid taxon	Thomas H. Rich	Patricia Vickers-Rich	Early Cretaceous (early Albian)	Eumeralla Formation	Australia	An ornithopod.	
Bihariosaurus	Valid taxon	Marinescu		Early Cretaceous (Berriasian)	Bauxite deposits	Romania	An iguanodont	
"Daptosaurus"	Junior synonym of Deinonychus	Brown vide: Chure	McIntosh					
"Eucentrosaurus"	Junior synonym of Centrosaurus	Chure	McIntosh					
Leaellynasaura	Valid taxon	Thomas H. Rich	Patricia Vickers-Rich	Early Cretaceous (early Albian)	Eumeralla Formation	Australia	An ornithopod.	Leaellynasaura
"Tenantosaurus"	Misspelling of Tenontosaurus	Brown vide: Chure	McIntosh					
Turanoceratops	Valid taxon	Lev A. Nesov and Kaznyshkina vide: Lev A. Nesov; Kaznyshkina	Cherepanov	Late Cretaceous (Turonian)	Bissekty Formation	Uzbekistan	A ceratopsid.	

==== Birds ====
Name	Status	Novelty	Authors	Age	Unit	Location	Notes	Images
Accipiter efficax	Valid	Sp. nov.	Balouet & Olson	Holocene	Cave deposits	New Caledonia	An Accipitridae.	
Accipiter quartus	Valid	Sp. nov.	Balouet & Olson	Holocene	Cave deposits	New Caledonia	An Accipitridae.	
Apatosagittarius	Valid	Gen et Sp nov.	Feduccia & Voorhies	Miocene; Late Clarendonian	Ash Hollow Formation	USA; Nebraska	An Accipitridae; The type species is A. terrenus	
Aplonis diluvialis	Valid	Sp. nov.	Steadman	Holocene	Huahine, Society Islands	French Polynesia	A Sturnidae.	
Caloenas canacorum	Valid	Sp. nov.	Balouet & Olson	Holocene	Cave deposits	New Caledonia	A Columbidae.	
Eociconia	Valid	Gen et sp. nov.	Hou	Middle Eocene	Yixibaila Formation	China	A Ciconiidae; The type species is E. sangequanensis	
Euronyctibius	Valid	Gen et sp. nov.	Mourer-Chauviré	Eocene; Late Eocene	Quercy Phosphorites Formation	France	First described as a Nyctibiidae transferred to Steatornithidae in 2013, The type species is E. kurochkini	
Gallicolumba longitarsus	Valid	Sp. nov.	Balouet & Olson	Holocene	Cave deposits	New Caledonia	A Columbidae.	
Megapodius alimentum	Valid	Sp. nov.	Steadman	Holocene	Lifuka	Tonga	A Megapodiidae.	
Megapodius molistructor	Valid	Sp. nov.	Balouet & Olson	Holocene; 1750 ± 70 YBP (Years Before Present)	Cave deposits	New Caledonia	A Megapodiidae.	
Noguerornis	Valid	Gen et sp nov.	Ruiz	Early Cretaceous; Late Berriasian-Early Valanginian		Spain; Catalonia	A Concornithidae enantiornithine The type species is N. gonzalezi.	
Porphyrio kukwiedei	Valid	Sp. nov.	Balouet & Olson	Holocene	Cave deposits	New Caledonia	A Rallidae.	
Puffinus nestori	Valid	Sp. nov.	Alcover	Late Pliocene	Cave deposits	Spain; Ibiza	A Procellariidae.	
Quercypodargus	Valid	Sp. nov.	Mourer-Chauviré	Eocene; Late Eocene	Quercy Phosphorites Formation	France	A Podargidae; The type species is Q. olsoni.	
Rhynochetos orarius	Disputed	Sp. nov.	Balouet & Olson	Holocene	Cave deposits	New Caledonia	A rhynochetid kagu. Theuerkauf & Gula (2018) considered this a jr synonym of the extant R. jubatus.	
Rostratula minator	Valid	Sp. nov.	Olson & Eller	Pliocene	Varswater Formation	South Africa	A Rostratulidae.	
Sazavis	Valid	Gen et sp nov.	Nessov & Yarkov	Late Cretaceous; Coniacian	Bissekty Formation	Uzbekistan	An Alexornithidae Enantiornithes; The type species is S. prisca	
Tyto letocarti	Valid	Sp. nov.	Balouet & Olson	Holocene	Cave deposits	New Caledonia	A Tytonidae.	
Volgavis	Valid	Gen et sp. nov.	Nessov & Yarkov	Late Cretaceous; Latest Maastrichtian		Russia	A limnofregatine fregatid The type species is V. marina	
Youngornis qiluensis	Valid	Sp. nov.	Yeh & Sun	Middle Miocene	Shanwang Formation	China	A Rallidae.	

=== Pterosaurs ===
Name	Status	Authors	Notes
Bogolubovia	Valid	Nesov A. A. Yarkov	
Mesadactylus	Valid	Jensen Padian	
Tapejara	Valid	Kellner	

== Synapsids ==
=== Newly named mammals ===
Name	Novelty	Status	Authors	Age	Unit	Location	Notes	Images
Diacodexis antunesi	Sp nov	Valid	Estravís & Russell	Early Eocene	Silveirinha Formation	Portugal	A diacodexeid	
