= L. occidentale =

L. occidentale may refer to:

- Lacistema occidentale
- Lilium occidentale
- Liometopum occidentale
- Lithothamnion occidentale
