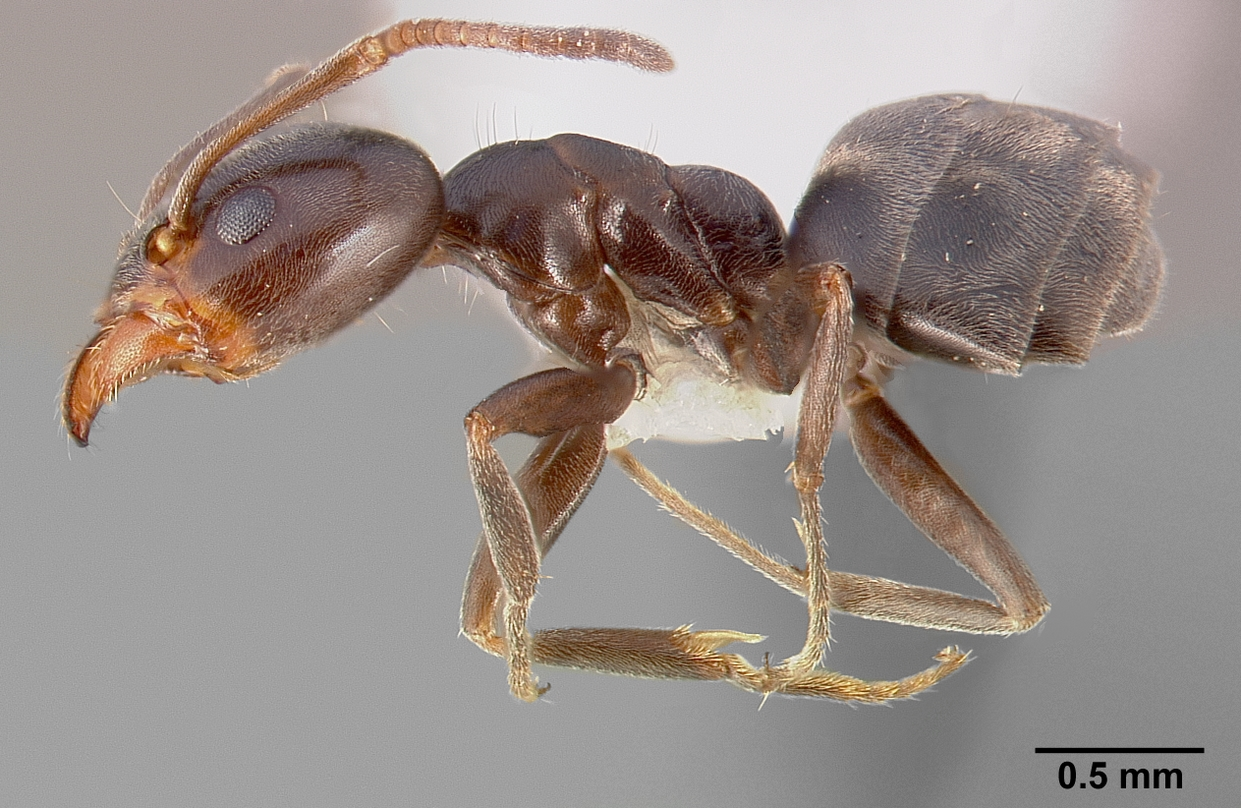
- L. luctuosum worker from the United States

Scientific classification
- Domain: Eukaryota
- Kingdom: Animalia
- Phylum: Arthropoda
- Class: Insecta
- Order: Hymenoptera
- Family: Formicidae
- Subfamily: Dolichoderinae
- Genus: Liometopum
- Species: L. luctuosum

Binomial name
- Liometopum luctuosum Wheeler, 1905

= Liometopum luctuosum =

Species of ant

Liometopum luctuosum is a species of ant in the subfamily Dolichoderinae. Liometopum luctuosum is often mistaken for carpenter ants (Camponotus spp.) by homeowners and pest management professionals. This mistaken identity is due to morphological and behavioral characteristics they share with carpenter ants; namely polymorphic workers, a smooth convex thoracic profile, and the tendency to excavate wood. L. luctuosum are also often confused with Tapinoma sessile since they have the same coloration, are similar in size, and produce an alarm pheromone with a very similar odor. Consequently, their importance as structural pests may be greatly under reported, especially in California, Oregon, and Washington, United States.

== Taxonomy ==
Liometopum luctuosum was originally named Liometopum apiculatum subsp. luctuosum by Wheeler (1905) and Forel (1914). Creighton (1950) reclassified it as a subspecies of Liometopum occidentale. It was elevated to species level by Wheeler & Wheeler (1986), and subsequently confirmed by Mackay et al. (1988) and Del Toro, Pacheco & Mackay (2009)

== Habitat ==
Liometopum luctuosum has been reported at elevations as low as 59 m, but is typically found at elevations higher than 2400 m in more southern latitudes. Their range extends from temperate habitats as far north as British Columbia, Canada, and to more arid habitats of central Mexico and western Texas. They inhabit pine, oak, Douglas fir, and juniper forests, sagebrush, and high-elevation riparian habitats. This species is often strongly associated with but not limited to pine trees.

== Nests ==
Liometopum luctuosum nest under rocks, decaying logs or at the base of large trees, or among the roots of trees such as Quercus spp., Juniperus spp. and Pinus spp. They create carton nests similar in structure to L. apiculatum. Similarly, the queen of L. luctuosum is well protected at a remote place about 6–8 m from the largest chamber where the brood is stored, and the chambers of the nest are connected by various galleries.

== Colonies ==
Colony foundation in L. luctuosum is by pleometrosis (cooperative), in which 2 to 40 fertile queens found a single colony. Most colony foundation activities take place at night. There is a division of labor among founder queens. However, this is not always divided the same for each foundation event. The amount of time dedicated to each activity by each queen varies with each colony foundation event. Some queens are active in a variety of tasks. For example, some queens dedicate more time to brood care and others more time patrolling the nest area. The fewer ants founding together (3 or less), the more time spent per individual caring for brood, ovipositing, and exploring. Trophallaxis, patrol activity, and inactivity decreases in these cases, but brood care still remains the primary activity of founding queens.

== Feeding ==
Liometopum luctuosum is also an omnivore and has been observed feeding on secretions from both plants and insects such as aphids, membracids and scales, as well as miscellaneous foods such as meat, eggs, fruit and bread.

== Foraging activity ==
To reach a food source, L. luctuosum establish trails sometimes more than 100 m long. The galleries of these trails often run under leaf litter. This protection could explain why these ants can be found trailing at almost any hour of the day.

== Reproduction ==
Reproductives of L. luctuosum have been observed flying in June and July and can be collected the day after the nuptial flight in large bodies of water or using a blacklight trap.
