= Liometopum escheri =

†Liometopum escheri Temporal range: Miocene

Scientific classification
- Kingdom: Animalia
- Phylum: Arthropoda
- Clade: Pancrustacea
- Class: Insecta
- Order: Hymenoptera
- Family: Formicidae
- Subfamily: Dolichoderinae
- Genus: Liometopum
- Species: L. escheri

Binomial name
- Liometopum escheri (Heer, 1867)

Species of ant

Liometopum escheri is an extinct species of Miocene ant in the genus Liometopum. Described by Heer in 1867, fossils of the species were found in Switzerland.
