= Liometopum ventrosum =

†Liometopum ventrosum Temporal range: Miocene

Scientific classification
- Kingdom: Animalia
- Phylum: Arthropoda
- Clade: Pancrustacea
- Class: Insecta
- Order: Hymenoptera
- Family: Formicidae
- Subfamily: Dolichoderinae
- Genus: Liometopum
- Species: L. ventrosum

Binomial name
- Liometopum ventrosum (Heer, 1849)

Species of ant

Liometopum ventrosum is an extinct species of Miocene ants in the genus Liometopum. Described by Heer in 1849, fossils of the species were found in Switzerland.
