= Liometopum stygium =

†Liometopum stygium Temporal range: Miocene

Scientific classification
- Kingdom: Animalia
- Phylum: Arthropoda
- Clade: Pancrustacea
- Class: Insecta
- Order: Hymenoptera
- Family: Formicidae
- Subfamily: Dolichoderinae
- Genus: Liometopum
- Species: L. stygium

Binomial name
- Liometopum stygium (Heer, 1867)

Species of ant

Liometopum stygium is an extinct species of Miocene ants in the genus Liometopum. Described by Heer in 1867, fossils of the species were found in Switzerland.
