= Liometopum sinense =

Scientific classification
- Domain: Eukaryota
- Kingdom: Animalia
- Phylum: Arthropoda
- Class: Insecta
- Order: Hymenoptera
- Family: Formicidae
- Subfamily: Dolichoderinae
- Genus: Liometopum
- Species: L. sinense

Binomial name
- Liometopum sinense Wheeler, W.M., 1921

Synonyms
- Liometopum dentimandibulum Chang & He, 2002; Liometopum sinense sericatum Wheeler, W.M., 1921

Species of ant

Liometopum sinense is a species of ant in the genus Liometopum. Described by William Morton Wheeler in 1921, the species is endemic to China.
