= Liometopum rhenana =

†Liometopum rhenana Oligocene

Scientific classification
- Kingdom: Animalia
- Phylum: Arthropoda
- Clade: Pancrustacea
- Class: Insecta
- Order: Hymenoptera
- Family: Formicidae
- Subfamily: Dolichoderinae
- Genus: Liometopum
- Species: L. rhenana

Binomial name
- Liometopum rhenana (Meunier, 1917)

Species of ant

Liometopum rhenana is an extinct species of Oligocene ant in the genus Liometopum. Described by Meunier in 1917, the fossils were found in Germany.
