= Liometopum pallidum =

†Liometopum pallidum Temporal range: Burdigalian, Early Miocene

Scientific classification
- Kingdom: Animalia
- Phylum: Arthropoda
- Clade: Pancrustacea
- Class: Insecta
- Order: Hymenoptera
- Family: Formicidae
- Subfamily: Dolichoderinae
- Genus: Liometopum
- Species: L. pallidum

Binomial name
- Liometopum pallidum (Heer, 1867)

Species of ant

Liometopum pallidum is an extinct species of Miocene ant in the genus Liometopum. Described by Heer in 1867, the fossils were found in Croatia.
