= Liometopum crassinervis =

†Liometopum crassinervis Temporal range: Miocene

Scientific classification
- Kingdom: Animalia
- Phylum: Arthropoda
- Clade: Pancrustacea
- Class: Insecta
- Order: Hymenoptera
- Family: Formicidae
- Subfamily: Dolichoderinae
- Genus: Liometopum
- Species: L. crassinervis

Binomial name
- Liometopum crassinervis (Heer, 1849)

Species of ant

Liometopum crassinervis is an extinct species of Miocene ants in the genus Liometopum. Described by Heer in 1849, fossils of the species were found in Switzerland.
