= Liometopum scudderi =

†Liometopum scudderi Temporal range: Fossil

Scientific classification
- Domain: Eukaryota
- Kingdom: Animalia
- Phylum: Arthropoda
- Class: Insecta
- Order: Hymenoptera
- Family: Formicidae
- Subfamily: Dolichoderinae
- Genus: Liometopum
- Species: L. scudderi

Binomial name
- Liometopum scudderi Carpenter, 1930

Species of ant

Liometopum scudderi is an extinct species of ant in the genus Liometopum. Described by Carpenter in 1930, the fossils of this species are only exclusive to the United States.
