= Liometopum oligocenicum =

†Liometopum oligocenicum Temporal range: Middle to Late Eocene Baltic amber

Scientific classification
- Domain: Eukaryota
- Kingdom: Animalia
- Phylum: Arthropoda
- Class: Insecta
- Order: Hymenoptera
- Family: Formicidae
- Subfamily: Dolichoderinae
- Genus: Liometopum
- Species: L. oligocenicum

Binomial name
- Liometopum oligocenicum Wheeler, W.M., 1915

Extinct species of ant

Liometopum oligocenicum is an extinct species of Miocene ant in the genus Liometopum. Described by William Morton Wheeler in 1915, the fossils were found in Baltic amber.
