= Western lily =

Western lily is a common name for several plants and may refer to:

- Calochortus, a wide spread genus in western North America
- Lilium occidentale, a rare species native to coastal southern Oregon and northern California
