= Liometopum croaticum =

†Liometopum croaticum Temporal range: Burdigalian, Early Miocene

Scientific classification
- Kingdom: Animalia
- Phylum: Arthropoda
- Clade: Pancrustacea
- Class: Insecta
- Order: Hymenoptera
- Family: Formicidae
- Subfamily: Dolichoderinae
- Genus: Liometopum
- Species: L. croaticum

Binomial name
- Liometopum croaticum (Heer, 1849)

Species of ant

Liometopum croaticum is an extinct species of Miocene ant in the genus Liometopum. Described by Heer in 1849, the fossils were found in Croatia.
