= Liometopum incognitum =

Liometopum incognitum Temporal range: Priabonian

Scientific classification
- Domain: Eukaryota
- Kingdom: Animalia
- Phylum: Arthropoda
- Class: Insecta
- Order: Hymenoptera
- Family: Formicidae
- Subfamily: Dolichoderinae
- Genus: Liometopum
- Species: L. incognitum

Binomial name
- Liometopum incognitum Dlussky, Rasnitsyn, & Perfilieva, 2015

Synonyms
- see text

Species of ant

Liometopum incognitum is an extinct species of formicid in the ant subfamily Dolichoderinae known from fossils found in eastern Asia.

== History and classification ==
Liometopum incognitum is known from single specimen which is a mostly complete adult queen in dorsal view. The holotype insect was discovered preserved as a compression fossil found in Russia. The specimen preserved in diatomite deposits of the Bol’shaya Svetlovodnaya site. Located in the Pozharsky District, on the Pacific Coast of Russia, the fossil bearing rocks preserve possibly Priabonian plants and animals which lived in a small lake near a volcano. The site has been attributed to either the Maksimovka or Salibez Formations and compared to the Bembridge Marls and Florissant Formation, both of which are Priabonian in age.

At the time of description, the holotype specimen, number PIN 3429/1157 was preserved in the A. A. Borissiak Paleontological Institute collections, part of the Russian Academy of Sciences. The fossil was first described by the trio of paleomyrmecologists Gennady Dlussky, Alexandr Rasnitsyn and Ksenia Perfilieva. In the type description, Dlussky, Rasnitsyn and Perfilieva named the species L. incognitum, with the specific epithet derived from the Latin "incognitum", which means unknown.

L. incognitum is one of a number of species in Liometopum that have been described. There are seven living species found in North America and Eurasian temperate to subtropical areas, while many fossil species are known from North America and Eurasia.

== Description ==
L. incognitum was described from a lone 14.5 mm (0.57 in) long queen preserved as a partial dorsal impression, missing portions of the legs, wings, antennae, and body. The head is slightly longer than its wide with rounded back corners of the head and the back margin slightly concave. The eyes are placed at the middle point of the head and oval in shape. The cutucle ridges of the face diverge away from each other.
