= Liometopum lubricum =

†Liometopum lubricum Temporal range: Miocene

Scientific classification
- Domain: Eukaryota
- Kingdom: Animalia
- Phylum: Arthropoda
- Class: Insecta
- Order: Hymenoptera
- Family: Formicidae
- Subfamily: Dolichoderinae
- Genus: Liometopum
- Species: L. lubricum

Binomial name
- Liometopum lubricum Zhang, Sun & Zhang, 1994

Species of ant

Liometopum lubricum is an extinct species of Miocene ant in the genus Liometopum. Described by Zhang, Sun and Zhang 1994, the fossils were found in China.
