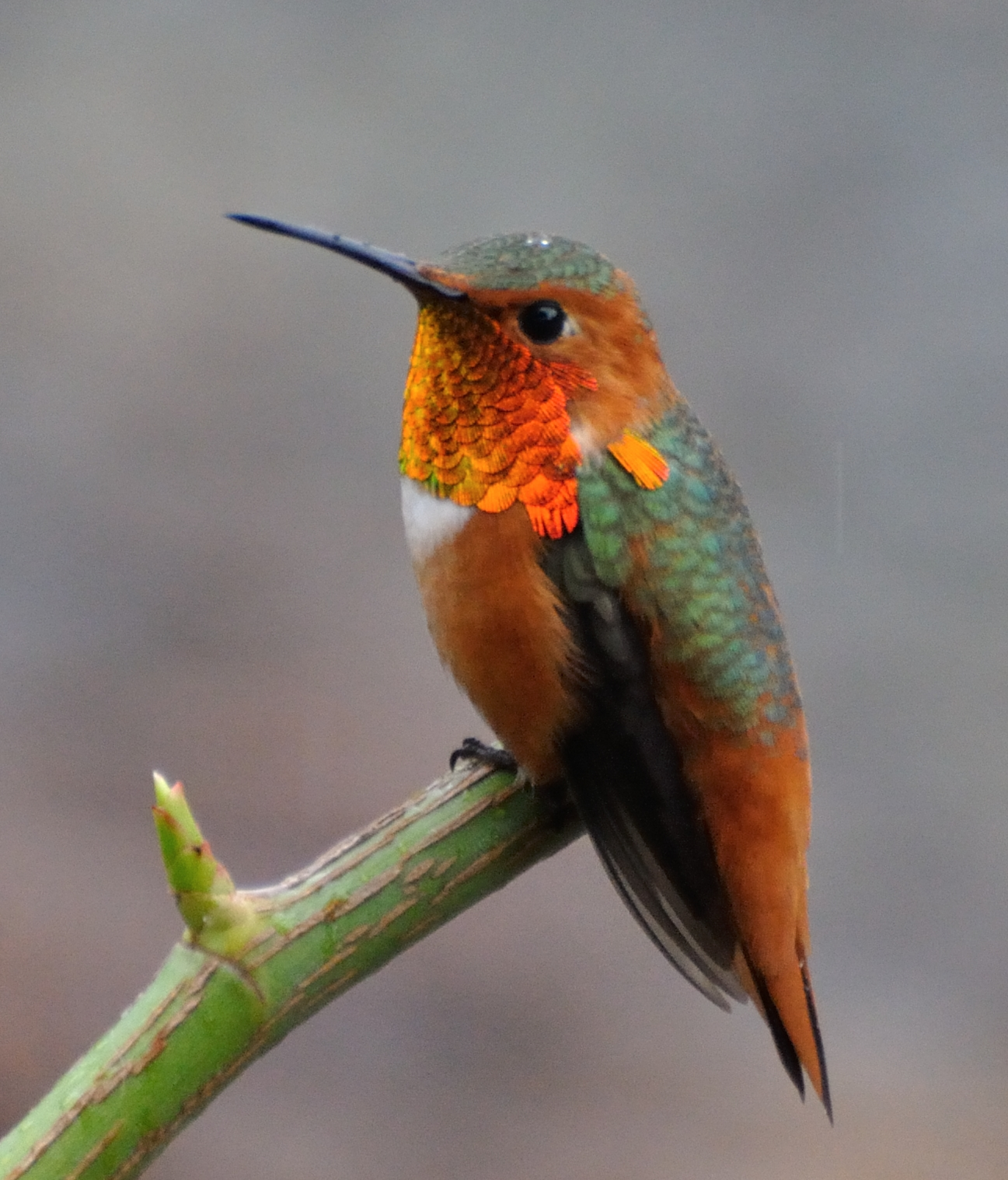
- Adult male

Conservation status
- Least Concern (IUCN 3.1)
- CITES Appendix II

Scientific classification
- Kingdom: Animalia
- Phylum: Chordata
- Class: Aves
- Order: Apodiformes
- Family: Trochilidae
- Genus: Selasphorus
- Species: S. sasin

Binomial name
- Selasphorus sasin (Lesson, RP, 1829)
- Range of S. sasin Breeding range Year-round range Wintering range

= Allen's hummingbird =

Species of bird

Allen's hummingbird (Selasphorus sasin) is a species of hummingbird that breeds in the western United States. It is one of seven species in the genus Selasphorus.

== Description ==
Allen's hummingbird is a small bird, with mature adults reaching only 3 to 3.5 in (76 to 89 mm) in length and weighing approximately 2 to 4 grams in weight. They are known for their vibrant colors and energetic behaviors, making them a popular subject for birdwatchers and nature enthusiasts. The male has a green back and forehead, with rust-colored (rufous) flanks, rump, and tail. The male's throat is an iridescent orange-red. The male hummingbirds make use of their elaborate colors to impress the females, which is crucial for mating season. The female and immature Allen's hummingbirds are similarly colored, but lack the iridescent throat patch, instead having a series of speckles on their throats. Females are mostly green, featuring rufous color only on the tail, which also has white tips. Immature Allen's hummingbirds are so similar to the female rufous hummingbird, the two are almost indistinguishable in the field.

The lack of a notch in the second rectrix is considered an important field mark to distinguish the adult male Allen's hummingbird from rufous hummingbird, particularly the hard to distinguish green-backed variety. The breeding seasons and ranges are common factors used to differentiate between the two species in a particular geographical area. Allen's hummingbirds breed mainly along coastal forests and shrub areas from California to Oregon.

Allen's hummingbird has a relatively short lifespan compared with other hummingbird species. They typically live between three and five years, with the oldest recorded Allen's hummingbird being at least 5 years and 11 months old.

== Taxonomy ==
Allen's hummingbird was formally described by the French naturalist René Lesson in 1829 and given the binomial name Ornismya sasin. The Allen's hummingbird is part of the family Trochilidae, which covers over 300 species of hummingbirds found primarily in the Americas. The specific epithet is a Wakashan or Nootka Native American name for a hummingbird. The type locality is San Francisco. Allen's hummingbird is now placed in the genus Selasphorus, which was introduced by William Swainson in 1832. The common name commemorates Charles Andrew Allen, an American collector and taxidermist who identified the bird in 1879 in Nicasio, California.

Two subspecies are recognised:

- S. s. sasin (Lesson, R, 1829) – breeds south Oregon and California (USA), winters in south central Mexico
- S. s. sedentarius Grinnell, 1929 – islands off south California (USA)

A hybrid between this species and Anna's hummingbird has been described as Floresi's hummingbird, "Selasphorus" floresii.

== Distribution ==
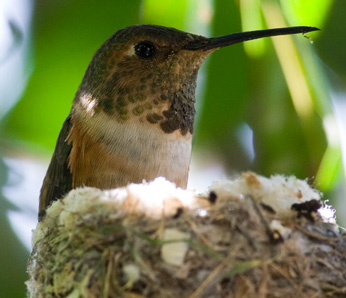
Adult female tending a nest

Allen's hummingbirds are commonly found in locations such as the brushy woods, gardens, and meadows of coastal California from Santa Barbara north, and southern coastal Oregon. Individuals breeding along these coasts migrate to central Mexico for the winter, while birds breeding on the Channel Islands and in southern California are mainly year-round residents.

The migratory habits of Allen's hummingbirds are closely linked to the availability of food sources, which affects their breeding success and survival rates. Male and female migratory patterns do not occur at the same time – the males head back north first early in the year, while the females arrive closer to spring, preparing to breed. This difference in timing helps reduce competition for food and nesting sites between males and females during the breeding season.

This population colonized the Palos Verdes Peninsula of Los Angeles County in the 1960s and has since spread over much of Los Angeles and Orange Counties, south through San Diego County, and east to the western end of Riverside County. The elevations in which these birds breed vary, peaking at around 1,000 feet. Allen's hummingbirds are increasingly threatened by human actions and habitat loss, an impact causing their population to decline by about 80% since the 1960s.

== Behavior ==
The courtship flight of male Allen's hummingbirds is a frantic back-and-forth flight arc of about 25 ft (7.6 m) similar to the motion of a swinging pendulum, followed by a high-speed dive from about 100 ft (30 m) during which tail feathers emit a characteristic sharp flutter to further attract attention of the female. Male Allen's hummingbirds are aggressive and territorial, chasing other males and different hummingbird species from their territory. They have even been known to attack and drive off predatory birds much larger than themselves, such as kestrels and hawks. After mating, the male does not stay and help the female raise the young. Both male and females utilize high-pitched vocalizations in familial and territorial social settings.

Females tend to reside in forests with large trees, such as oak-pine, douglas fir, and redwood, providing ample protection and nest material. Allen's hummingbird constructs its nest out of plant fibers, down, and weed stems, coating the nest with lichens and spider webs to give it structure. This process is gradual, taking about a week to build a nest of adequate size. They often put their nests in spots that are safe to keep them away from predators. The nest is placed above ground on a tree branch or the stalk or stem of a plant. The female lays one or two white eggs, which she incubates for 15 to 17 days. The young leave the nest about three weeks after hatching. The mother continues to feed the fledglings for several more weeks, then the young are left to fend for themselves. When females create new nests, they often utilize their old one; some move the previous nest's materials to another location and start anew, while others simply repair their original designs.

Like all hummingbirds, Allen's hummingbird's high rate of metabolism requires it to feed frequently. It drinks nectar from flowers and eats small insects (such as flies, ants, small beetles, spiders, and tiny wasps) in flight or on flower blossoms, providing needed protein and energy. Its feeding on nectar from flowers supports pollination, including the endangered Western lily, other coastal lilies, and monkey flower.

Also, similar to other birds, Allen's hummingbirds use their feet as a means of maintaining body temperature; in colder months, they often tuck their feet into their feathers during flight, which keeps them warmer, while in warmer months, they fly with their feet dangling to enable cooling.

== Gallery ==
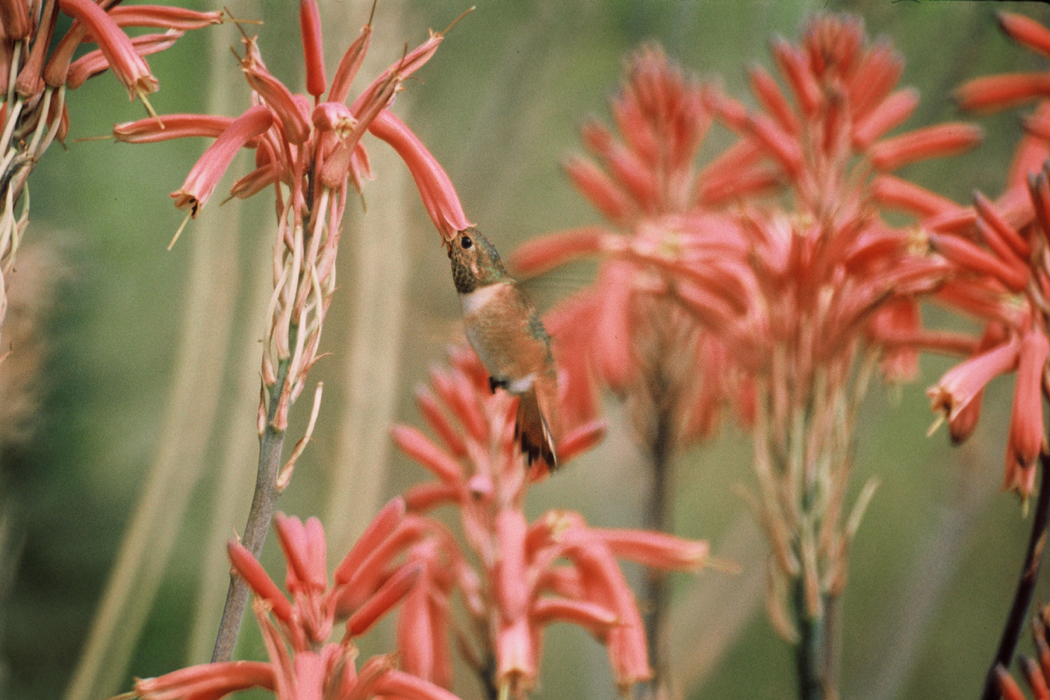
Feeding

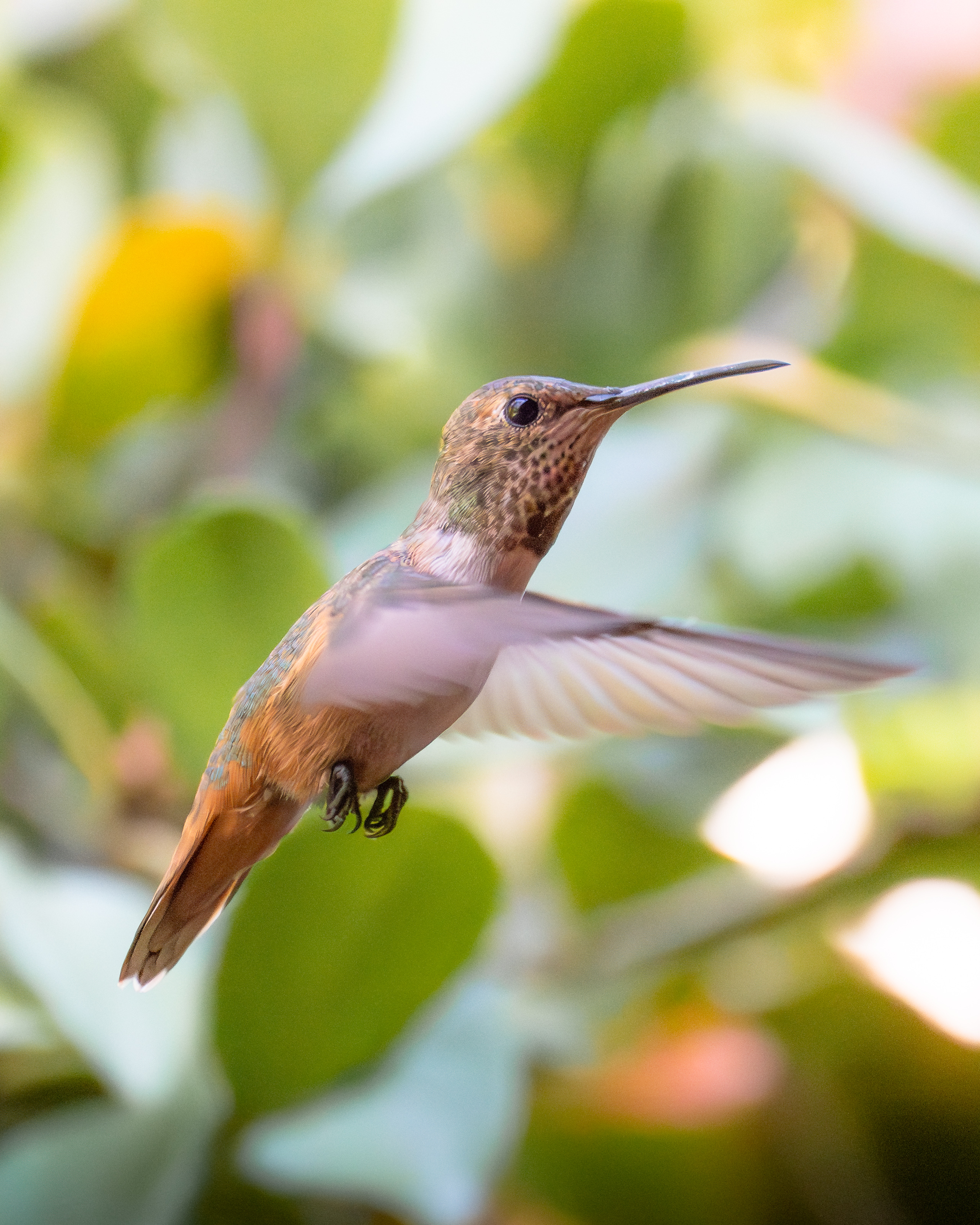
Flying female Allen's hummingbird

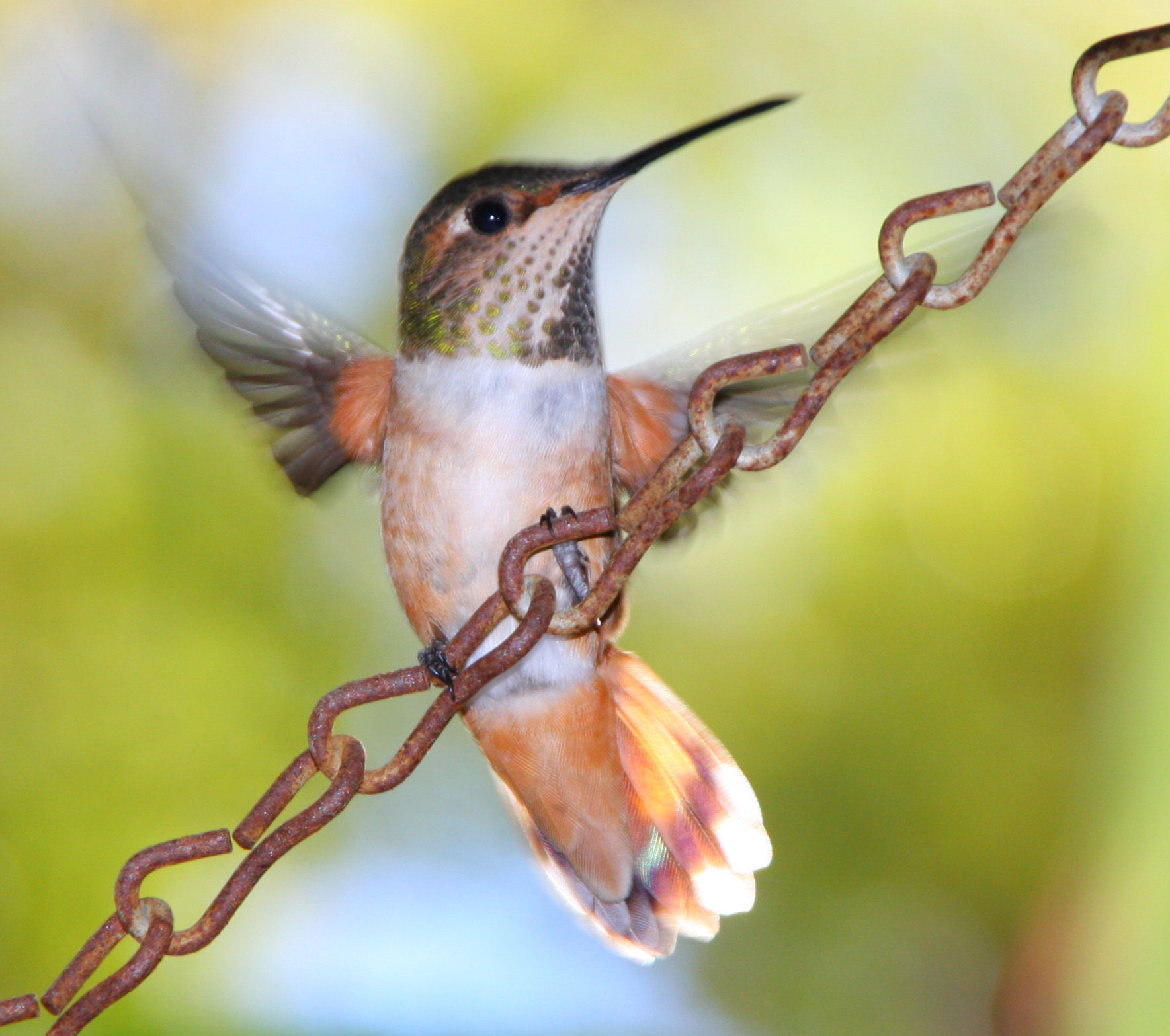
Juvenile male or female

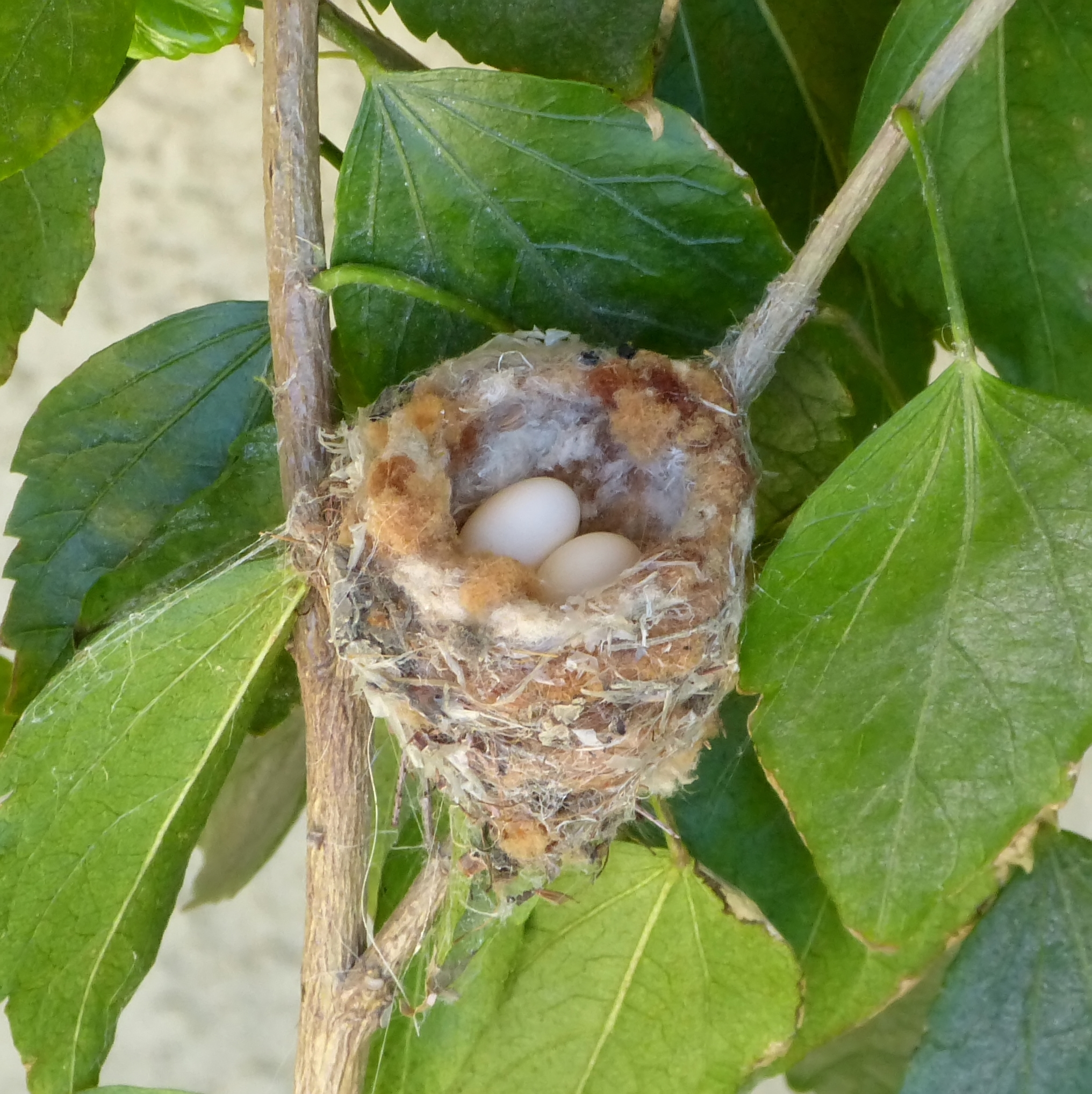
Nest and eggs

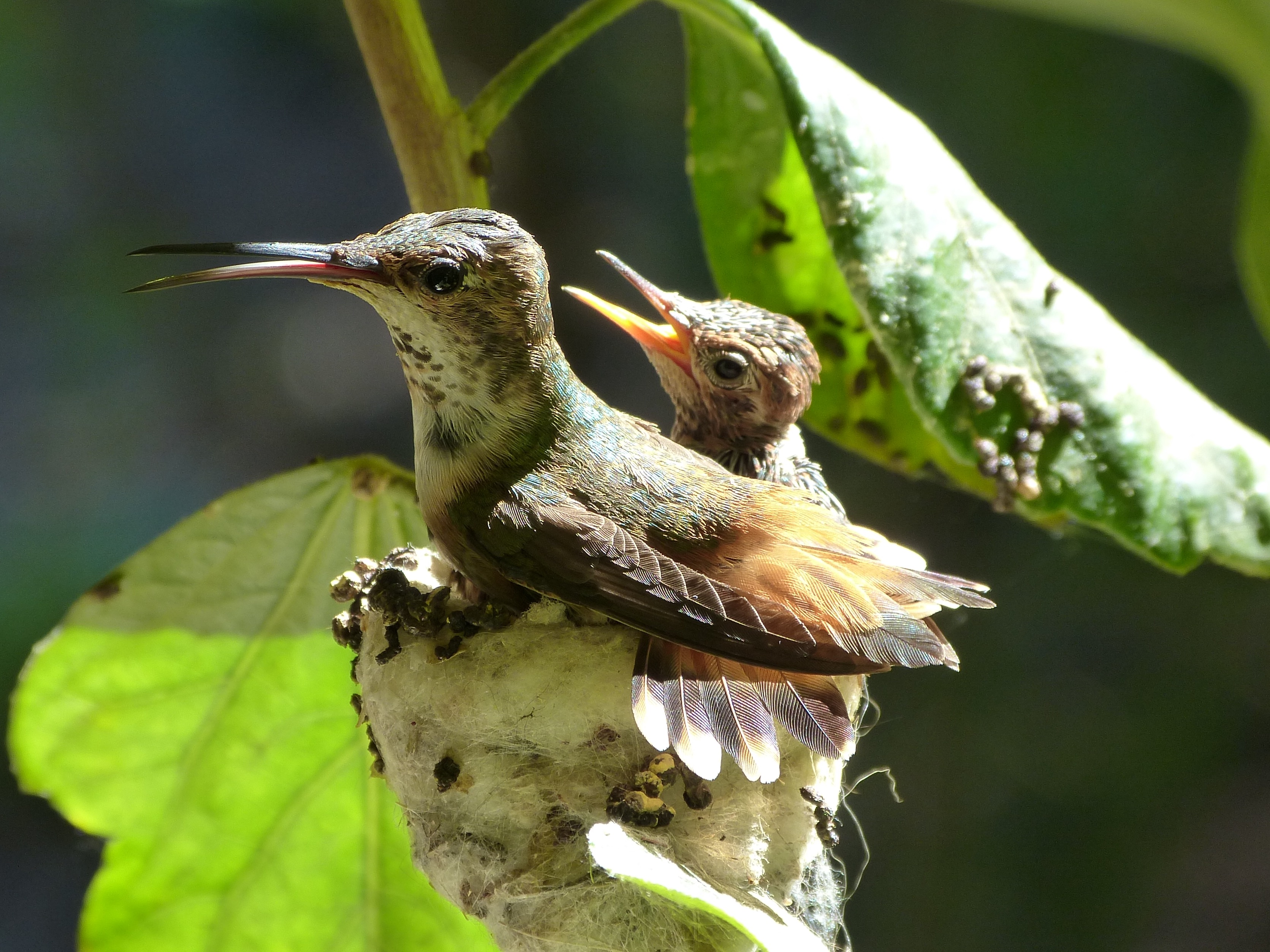
Nestlings

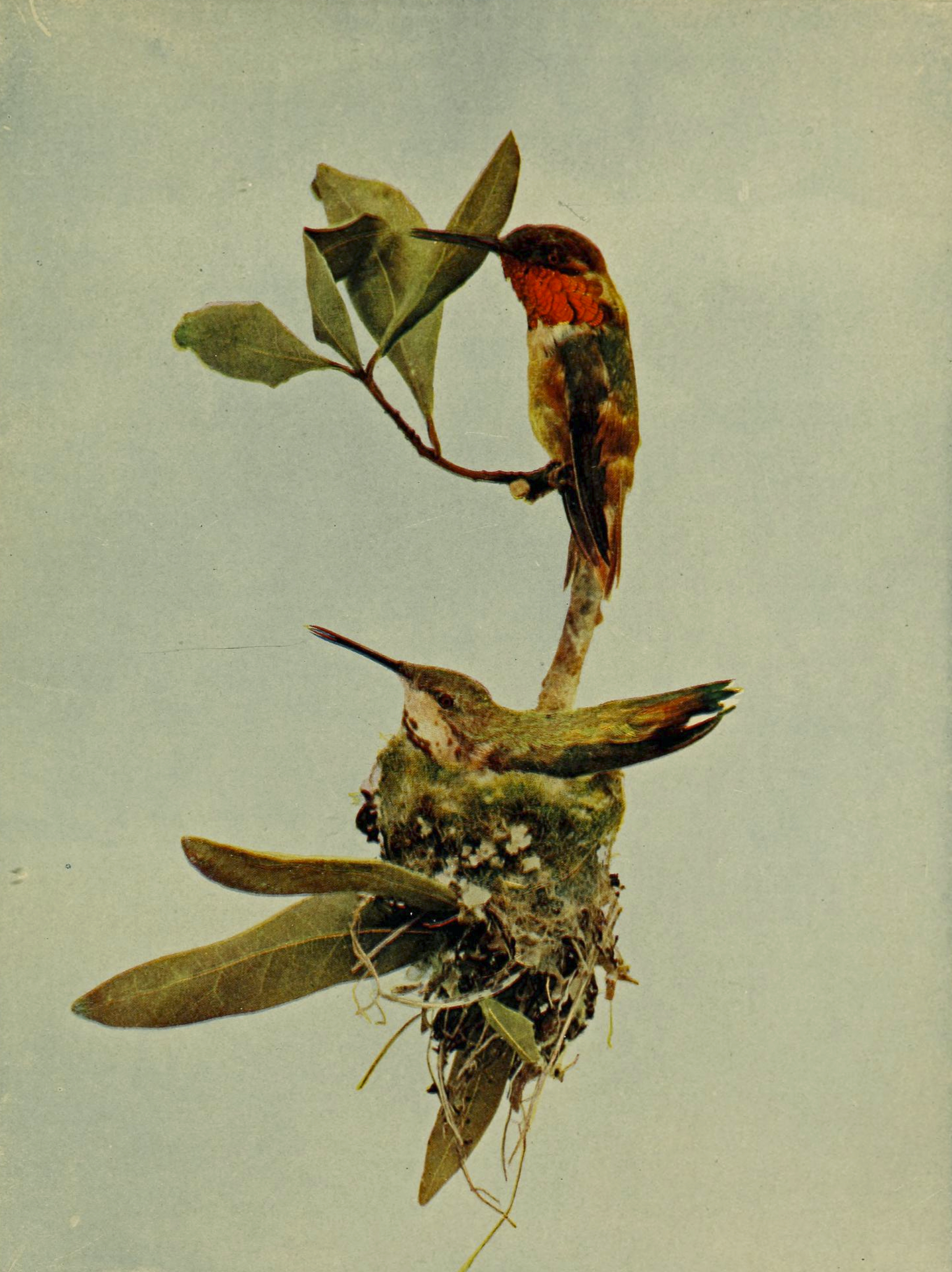
In art
