= Liometopum orientale =

Scientific classification
- Domain: Eukaryota
- Kingdom: Animalia
- Phylum: Arthropoda
- Class: Insecta
- Order: Hymenoptera
- Family: Formicidae
- Subfamily: Dolichoderinae
- Genus: Liometopum
- Species: L. orientale

Binomial name
- Liometopum orientale Karavaiev, 1927

Species of ant

Liometopum orientale is a species of ant in the genus Liometopum. Described by Karavaiev in 1927, the species is endemic to the Russian Federation and North Korea.
