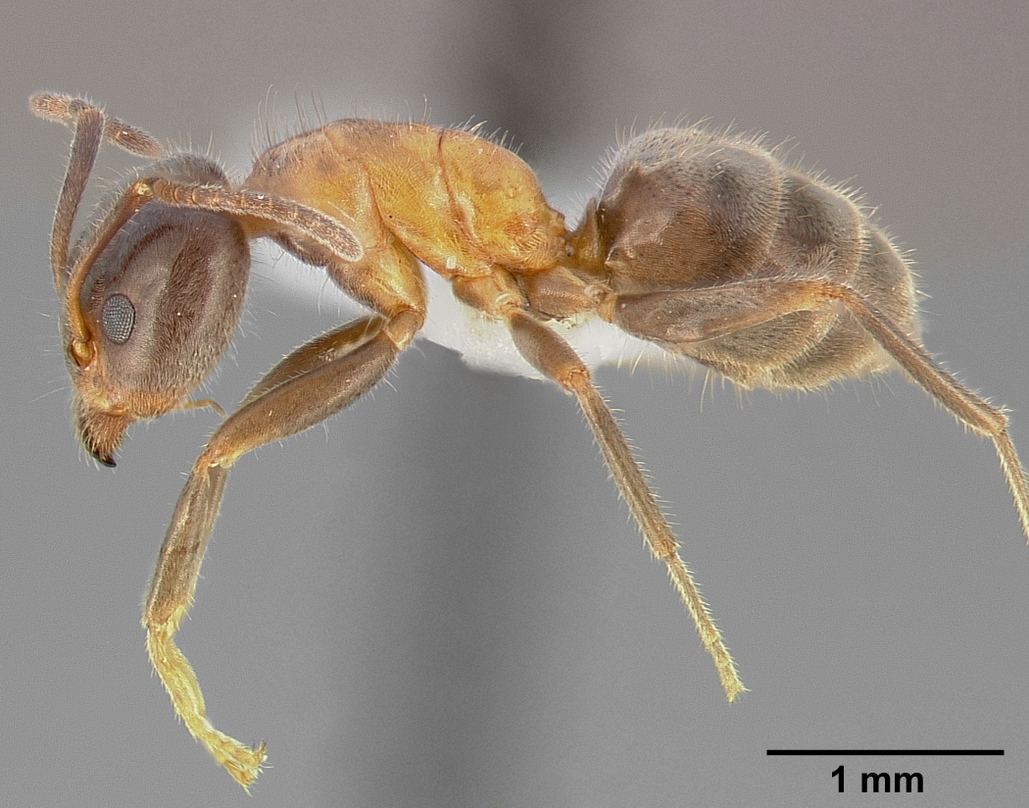
- Liometopum occidentale worker

Scientific classification
- Kingdom: Animalia
- Phylum: Arthropoda
- Class: Insecta
- Order: Hymenoptera
- Family: Formicidae
- Subfamily: Dolichoderinae
- Tribe: Tapinomini
- Genus: Liometopum; Mayr, 1861

Type species
- Formica microcephala Panzer, 1798

Species
- See text

Diversity
- 28 species

Synonyms
- †Poneropsis Heer, 1867

= Liometopum =

Genus of ants

Liometopum is a genus of ants that belongs to the subfamily Dolichoderinae, found in North America, Europe and Asia.

Caterpillars of certain butterfly species have a symbiotic relationship with Liometopum ants. They produce secretions that the ants will feed on, similar to the behavior of the ant genus Iridomyrmex.

== Species ==
- Liometopum apiculatum Mayr, 1870
- †Liometopum bogdassarovi (Nazaraw, Bagdasaraw & Uriew, 1994)
- †Liometopum brunascens (Heer, 1867)
- †Liometopum crassinervis Heer, 1849
- †Liometopum croaticum (Heer, 1849)
- †Liometopum eremicum Zhang, 1989
- †Liometopum escheri (Heer, 1867)
- †Liometopum globosum (Heer, 1849)
- †Liometopum imhoffii (Heer, 1849)
- †Liometopum incognitum Dlussky, Rasnitsyn, & Perfilieva, 2015
- Liometopum lindgreeni Forel, 1902
- †Liometopum longaevum (Heer, 1849)
- †Liometopum lubricum Zhang, Sun & Zhang, 1994
- Liometopum luctuosum Wheeler, 1905 – the pine tree ant
- Liometopum masonium (Buckley, 1866)
- Liometopum microcephalum (Panzer, 1798)
- †Liometopum miocenicum Carpenter, 1930
- Liometopum occidentale Emery, 1895 – the velvety tree ant
- †Liometopum oligocenicum Wheeler, 1915
- Liometopum orientale Karavaiev, 1927
- †Liometopum pallidum (Heer, 1867)
- †Liometopum potamophilum Zhang, 1989
- †Liometopum rhenana (Meunier, 1917)
- †Liometopum scudderi Carpenter, 1930
- Liometopum sinense Wheeler, 1921
- †Liometopum stygium (Heer, 1867)
- †Liometopum venerarium (Heer, 1864)
- †Liometopum ventrosum (Heer, 1849)

== See also ==
- Escamoles, a Mexican dish made from Liometopum larvae and pupae
