= Liometopum brunascens =

†Liometopum brunascens Temporal range: Burdigalian, Early Miocene

Scientific classification
- Kingdom: Animalia
- Phylum: Arthropoda
- Clade: Pancrustacea
- Class: Insecta
- Order: Hymenoptera
- Family: Formicidae
- Subfamily: Dolichoderinae
- Genus: Liometopum
- Species: L. brunascens

Binomial name
- Liometopum brunascens (Heer, 1867)

Species of ant

Liometopum brunascens is an extinct species of Miocene ant in the genus Liometopum. Described by Heer in 1867, the fossils were found and described from Croatia.
