= Liometopum bogdassarovi =

†Iridomyrmex bogdassarovi Temporal range: Quaternary

Scientific classification
- Kingdom: Animalia
- Phylum: Arthropoda
- Class: Insecta
- Order: Hymenoptera
- Family: Formicidae
- Subfamily: Dolichoderinae
- Genus: Liometopum
- Species: L. bogdassarovi

Binomial name
- Liometopum bogdassarovi Nazaraw, Bagdasaraw & Uriew, 1994

Species of ant

Liometopum bogdassarovi is an extinct species of ant in the genus Liometopum, found in Belarus. Described by Nazarov, Bogdasarov, Uryev in 1994, the fossils are relatively young and are guessed to be from the Quaternary period, and was originally placed in the genus Iridomyrmex.
