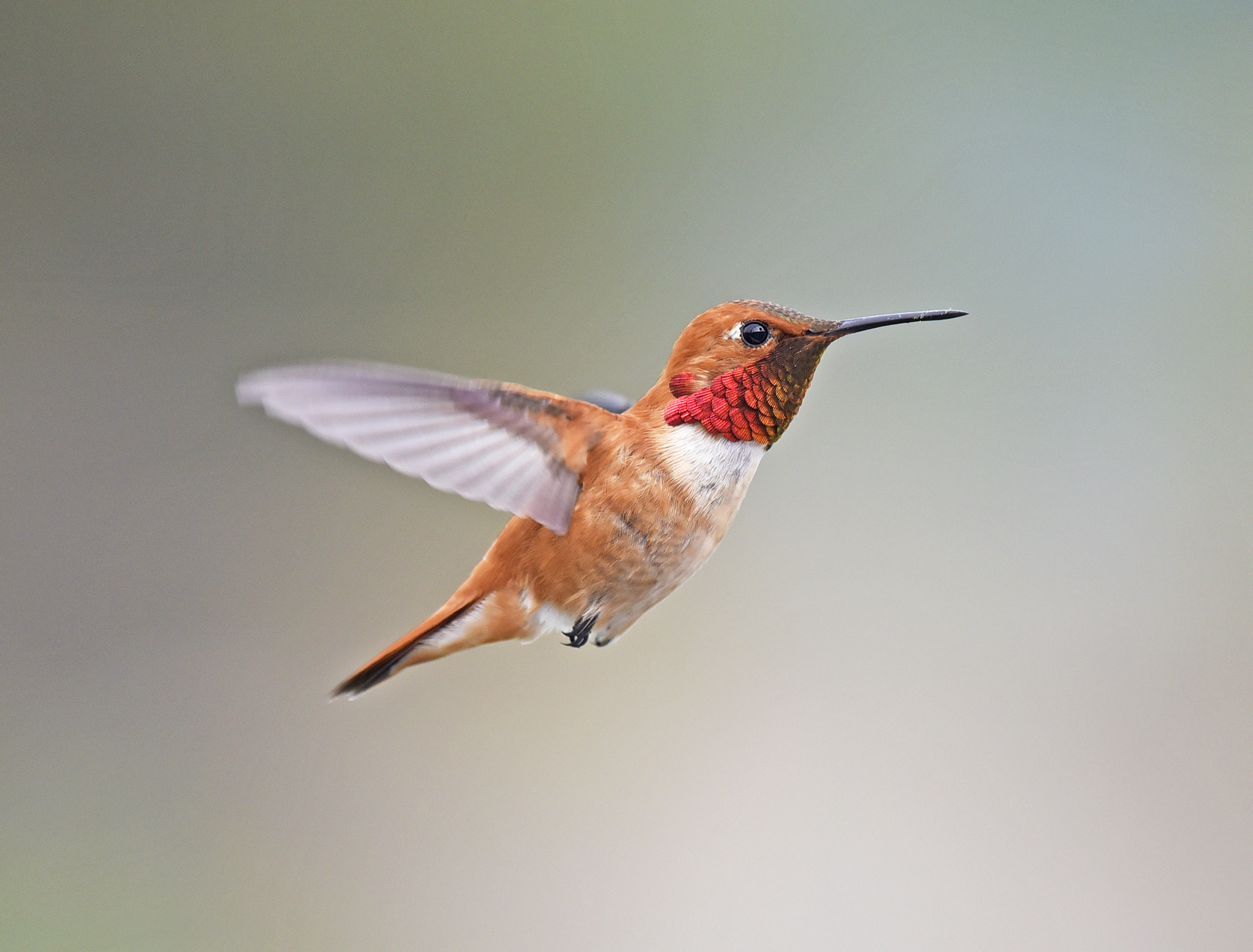
- Male in hovering flight

Conservation status
- Near Threatened (IUCN 3.1)
- CITES Appendix II

Scientific classification
- Kingdom: Animalia
- Phylum: Chordata
- Class: Aves
- Clade: Strisores
- Order: Apodiformes
- Family: Trochilidae
- Genus: Selasphorus
- Species: S. rufus

Binomial name
- Selasphorus rufus (Gmelin, JF, 1788)
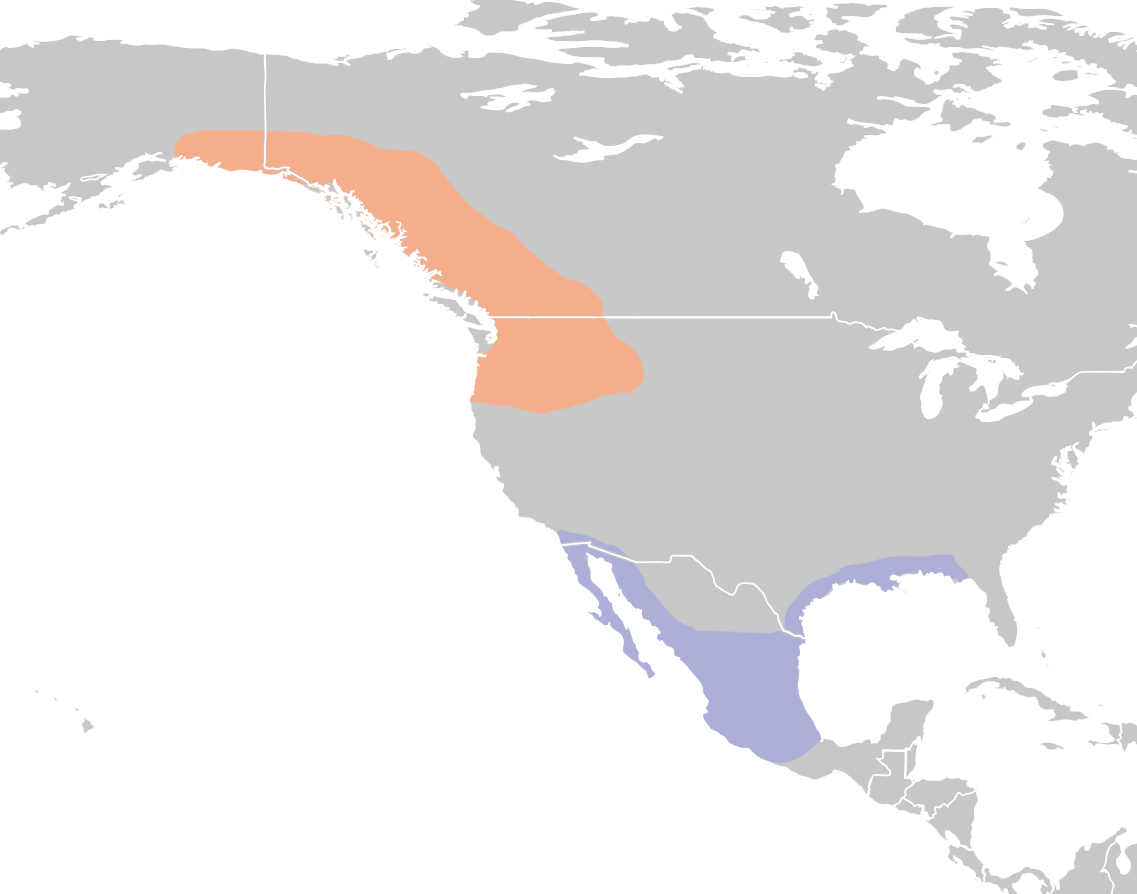
- Summer, breeding range Winter range

= Rufous hummingbird =

Species of bird

The rufous hummingbird (Selasphorus rufus) is a small hummingbird, about 8 cm (3 in) long with a long, straight and slender bill. These birds are known for their extraordinary flight skills, flying 3,200 kilometres (2,000 miles) during their migratory transits. It is one of nine species in the genus Selasphorus.

== Taxonomy ==
The rufous hummingbird was formally described in 1788 by the German naturalist Johann Friedrich Gmelin in his revised and expanded edition of Carl Linnaeus's Systema Naturae. He placed it with all the other hummingbirds in the genus Trochilus. He coined the binomial name Trochilus rufus. Gmelin based his description on the ruff-necked hummingbird described by John Latham in 1782 and the ruffed honeysucker described by Thomas Pennant in 1785.

The type locality given by Gmelin was Nootka Sound on the west coast of Vancouver Island in western Canada. However, breeding was estimated to occur in northwestern North America and wintering in westcentral Mexico. The rufous hummingbird is now placed with eight other species in the genus Selasphorus that was introduced in 1832 by the English naturalist William Swainson. The genus name combines the Ancient Greek selas meaning "light" or "flame" with -phoros meaning "-carrying". The specific epithet rufus is the Latin word for "red". The species is considered as monotypic: no subspecies are recognized.

== Description ==
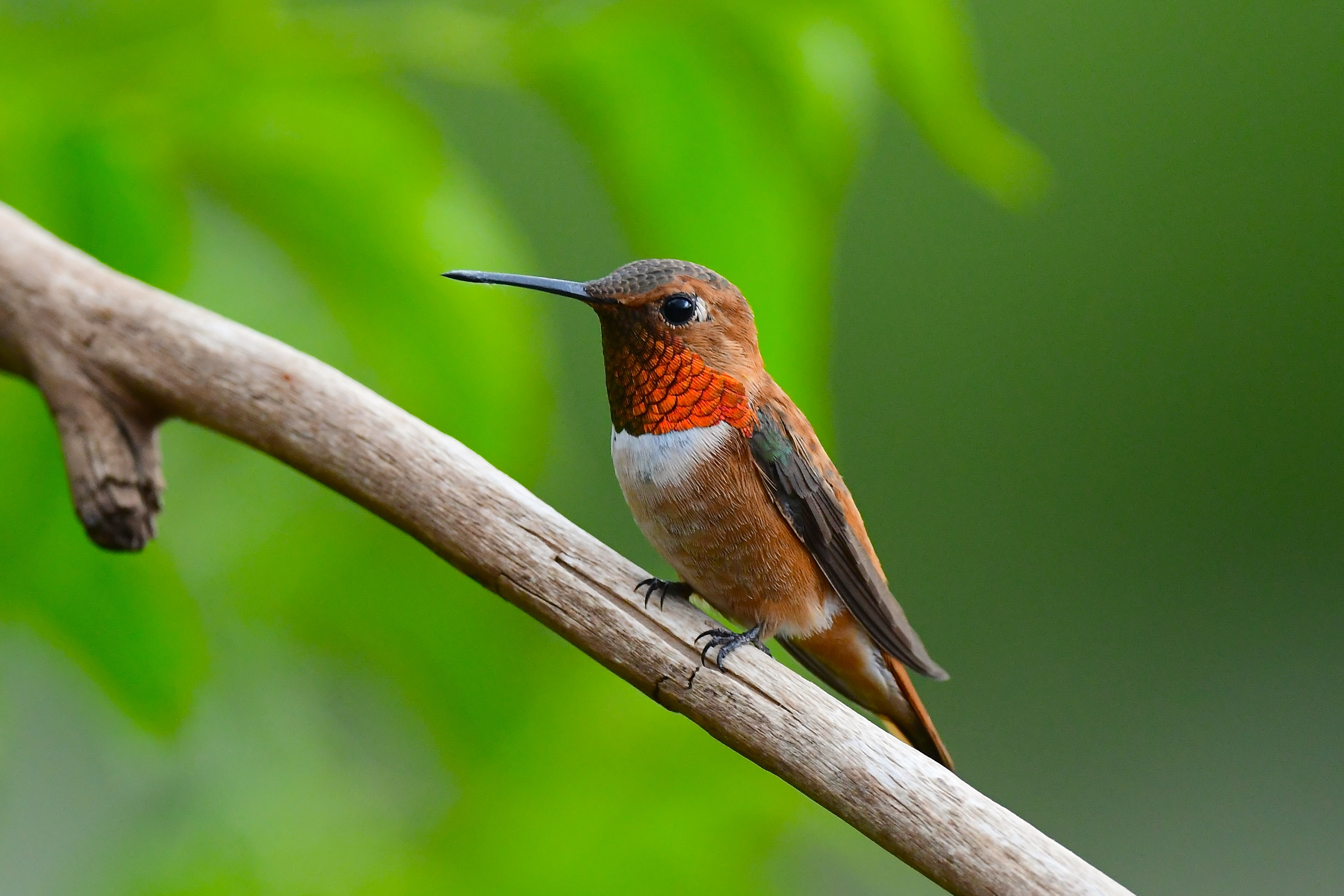
Perched male

The adult male has a white breast, rufous face, flanks and tail, and an iridescent orange-red throat patch or gorget. Some males have some green on their back and/or crown. The female has green, white, and some iridescent orange feathers in the center of the throat, and a dark tail with white tips and a rufous base.

The female is slightly larger than the male. Females and the rare green-backed males are difficult to differentiate from Allen's hummingbird. The typical "notched" shape of the second rectrix (R2) is considered an important field mark to distinguish the adult male rufous hummingbird from the adult male Allen's hummingbird. This is a typical-sized hummingbird, being a small bird. It weighs 2–5 g (1/16–3/16 oz), measures 7–9 cm (3–3 1/2 in) long and spans 11 cm (4 1/2 in) across the wings.

== Distribution and habitat ==
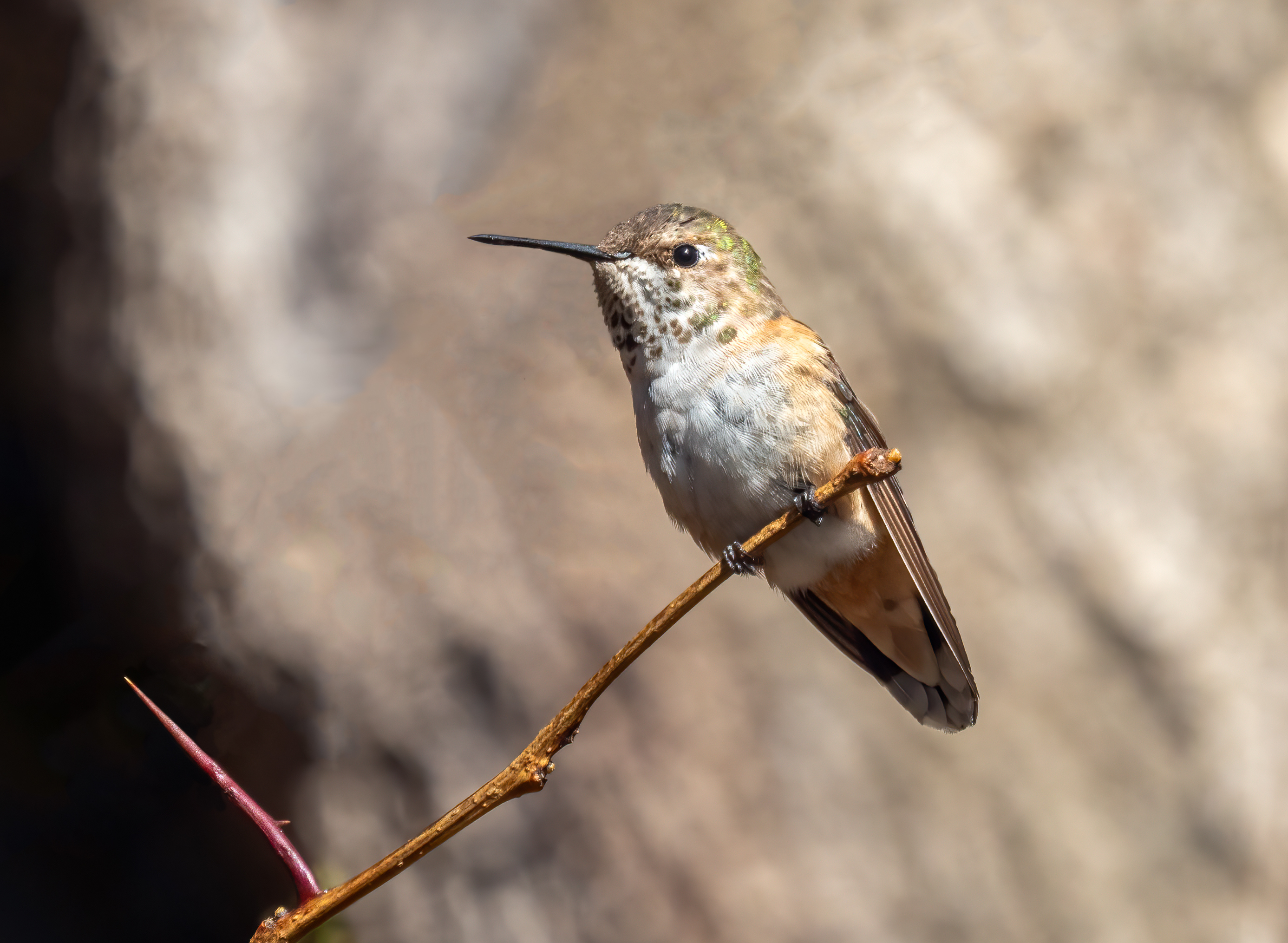
Perched female

Western rufous hummingbirds migrate through the Rocky Mountains and nearby lowlands from May to September to take advantage of the wildflower season. They may stay in one local region for the entire summer, in which case the migrants (like breeding birds) often aggressively take over and defend feeding locations. Most individuals winter in wooded areas in the Mexican state of Guerrero, traveling over 3,200 km (2,000 mi) by an overland route from their nearest summer home – a prodigious journey for a bird weighing only 3 to 4 g (3/32 to 5/32 oz).

Adult male rufous hummingbirds tend to migrate slightly earlier than females or young. Since juveniles and females are essentially indistinguishable from Allen's hummingbird, unless confirmed by close inspection, eastern rufous migrants may be classified as "rufous/Allen's hummingbirds".

== Behavior and ecology ==
=== Food and feeding ===
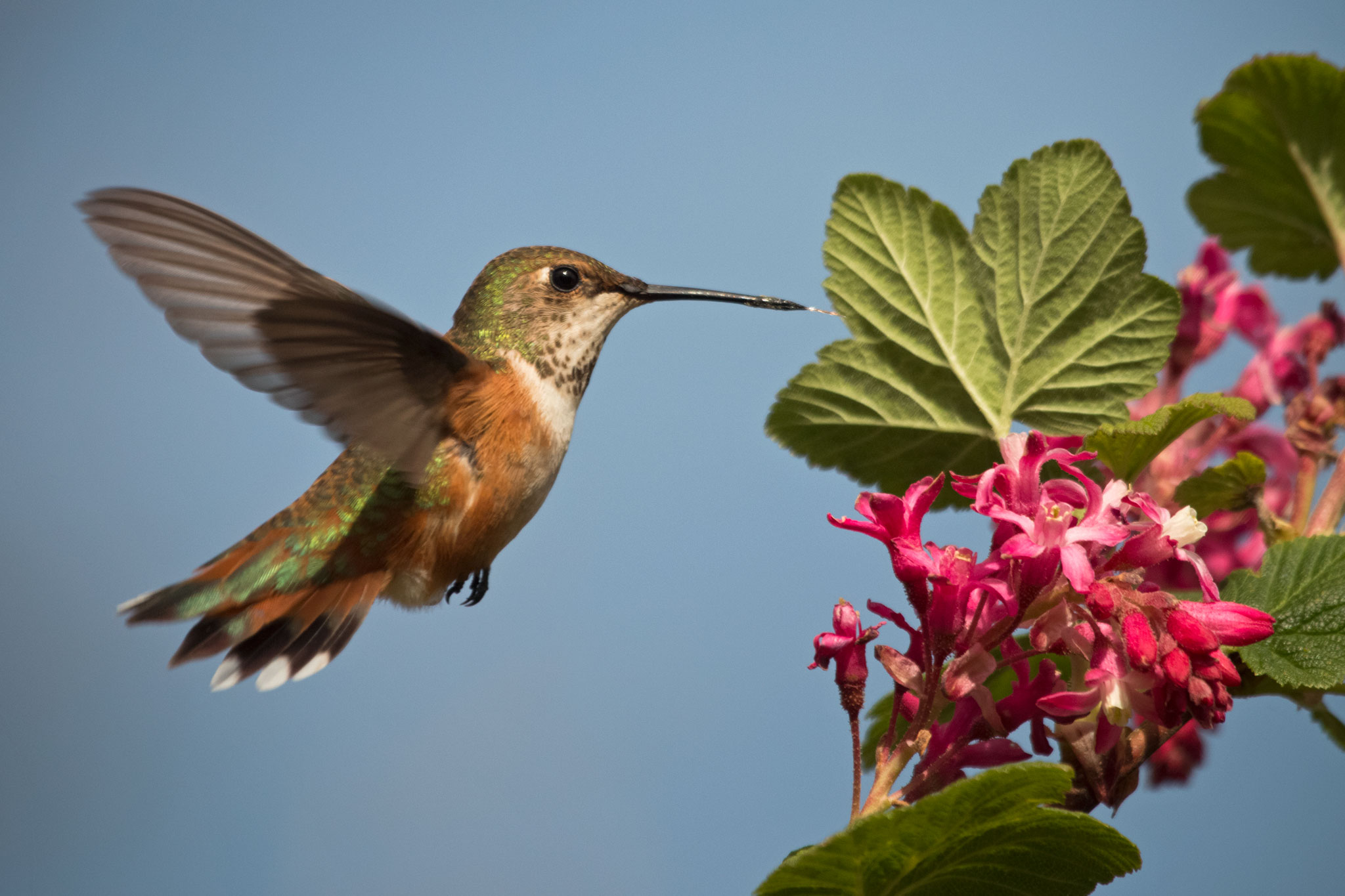
Hovering female at currant flowers

They feed on nectar from flowers using a long extendable tongue or catch insects on the wing. These birds require frequent feeding while active during the day and become torpid at night to conserve energy. Because of their small size, they are vulnerable to insect-eating birds and animals.

=== Hovering and sexual dimorphism ===
A study that used digital imaging velocimetry to look at wing movements found that the rufous hummingbird supports its body weight during hovering primarily by wing downstrokes (75% of lift) rather than by upstrokes (25% of lift). When hovering during fasting, rufous hummingbirds oxidize fatty acids to support metabolism and food energy requirements, but can rapidly switch to carbohydrate metabolism (within 40 minutes) after feeding on flower nectar.

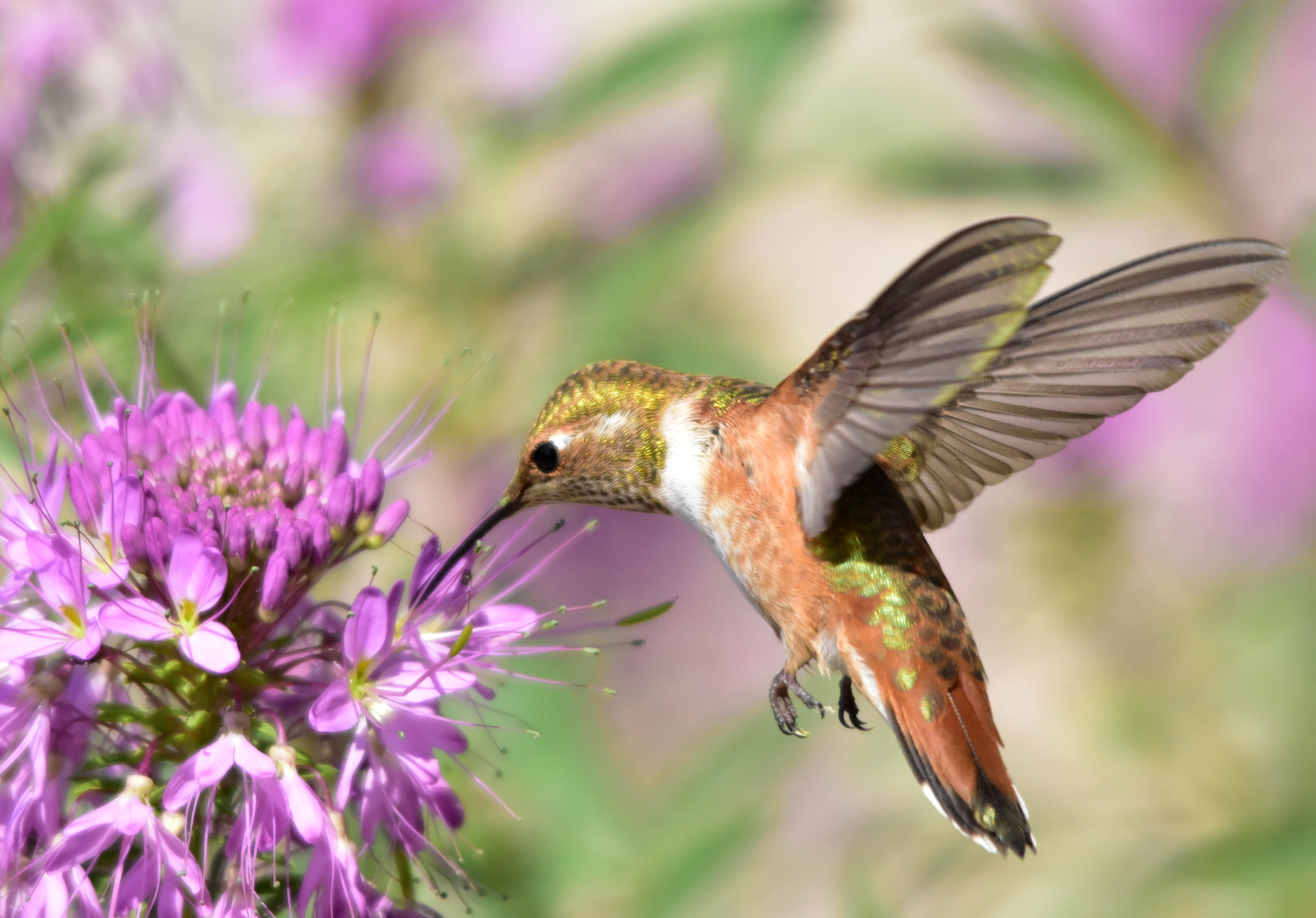
A juvenile male nectaring on Rocky Mountain beeplant in Wyoming

Both males and females are territorial; however, they defend different types of territories. The more aggressive males fight to defend areas with dense flowers, pushing females into areas with more sparsely populated flowers. Males generally have shorter wings than females; therefore, their metabolic cost for hovering is higher. This allows males to beat their wings at high frequencies, giving them the ability to chase and attack other birds to defend their territory. The metabolic cost of short wings is compensated for by the fact that these males do not need to waste energy foraging for food, because their defended territory provides plenty of sustenance. Females on the other hand are not given access to the high concentration food sources, because the males fight them off. Therefore, females generally defend larger territories, where flowers are more sparsely populated, forcing them to fly farther between food sources. The metabolic cost of flying farther is compensated for with longer wings providing more efficient flight for females. The differences in wing length demonstrate a distinct sexual dimorphism, allowing each sex to best exploit resources in an area.

=== Breeding ===
Their primary breeding habitats are open areas, mountainsides and forest edges in western North America from southern Alaska through British Columbia and the Pacific Northwest to California, nesting further north (Alaska) than any other hummingbird. The female builds a nest in a protected location in a shrub or conifer. Males are promiscuous, mating with several females.

== Conservation status ==
In 2018, the rufous hummingbird was uplisted from least concern to near threatened on the IUCN Red List, on the basis that due to its reliance on insect prey during the wintering season, it will be heavily affected by the global decline in insect populations due to pesticides and intensified agriculture. Due to climate change, many flowers that the rufous hummingbird feeds on during the breeding season have started blooming two weeks prior to the birds' arrival to their breeding locations, which may lead to rufous hummingbirds arriving too late to feed on them.

== Gallery ==
Slow-motion video of rufous hummingbird attacking Anna's hummingbird at feeder. Video taken at 2000 fps, or about 1/67 of real-time.

Rufous hummingbird feeding in slow motion at 2000 fps or 1/67 of real-time.
