= Liometopum miocenicum =

†Liometopum miocenicum Temporal range: Fossil

Scientific classification
- Domain: Eukaryota
- Kingdom: Animalia
- Phylum: Arthropoda
- Class: Insecta
- Order: Hymenoptera
- Family: Formicidae
- Subfamily: Dolichoderinae
- Genus: Liometopum
- Species: L. miocenicum

Binomial name
- Liometopum miocenicum Carpenter, 1930

Species of ant

Liometopum miocenicum is an extinct species of ant in the genus Liometopum. Described by Carpenter in 1930, the fossils of this species are only exclusive to the United States.
