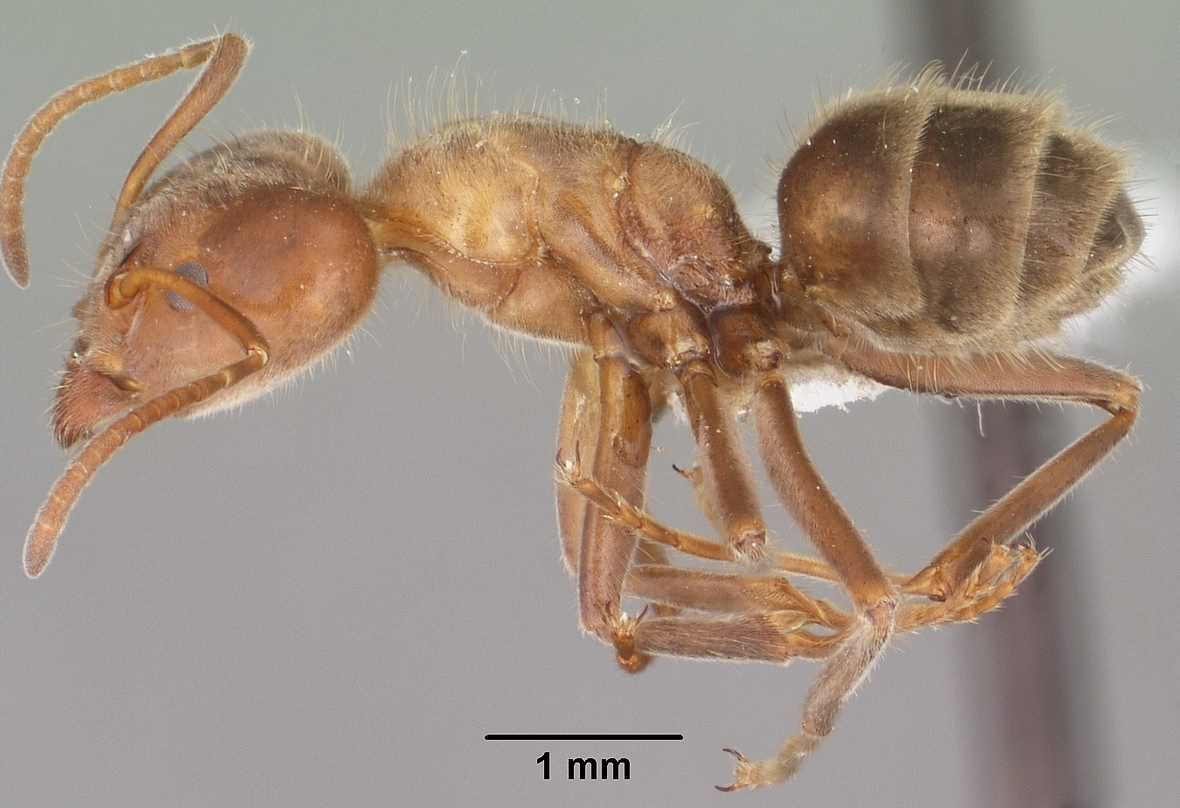
- L. apiculatum worker from the United States

Scientific classification
- Domain: Eukaryota
- Kingdom: Animalia
- Phylum: Arthropoda
- Class: Insecta
- Order: Hymenoptera
- Family: Formicidae
- Subfamily: Dolichoderinae
- Genus: Liometopum
- Species: L. apiculatum

Binomial name
- Liometopum apiculatum Mayr, 1870

Synonyms
- Liometopum masonium Buckley, 1866 (nomen oblitum)

= Liometopum apiculatum =

Species of ant

Liometopum apiculatum is a species of ant in the subfamily Dolichoderinae. Liometopum apiculatum ants are found in arid and semi-arid regions of southwestern United States and Mexico to Quintana Roo.

== Taxonomy ==
Liometopum apiculatum was first described by Mayr (1870), who described the workers of this species. Emery (1895) later described the queens of this species; Wheeler (1905) described the males and Wheeler & Wheeler (1951) described the larvae. Shattuck (1994) considered L. apiculatum a senior synonym of Liometopum masonium. This species was also confirmed by Del Toro et al. (2009).

== Habitat ==
Liometopum apiculatum ants are found in arid and semi-arid regions of southwestern United States and Mexico to Quintana Roo. They extend from Colorado through Texas, New Mexico, southeastern Arizona, and south into Mexico. They are usually found at elevations of 1,000–2,500 metres (3,300–8,200 ft), but their prime habitat is oak forests found around 2,000 m (6,600 ft). At higher elevations they are found in pinyon pine zones, up to the ponderosa pine and riparian zones; at lower elevations they inhabit creosote bush scrub and grasslands in microhabitats of clay, under rocks, boulders, and decaying logs. They have also been found in foothill meadows, deciduous canyon forests, pinyon-cedar woodlands, ponderosa pine-cedar-oak woodlands, and cottonwood–willow forests. At high elevations, their abundance decreases and they are replaced by L. luctuosum. Altitude may play an important role in the distribution of Liometopum. In regions of Mexico explored by Conconi et al. (1983b), L. luctuosum and L. apiculatum are only found between 2,000 and 3,000 m (6,600 and 9,800 ft). Although conditions below 1,800 m (5,900 ft) looked favorable, they are absent. In the U.S., L. apiculatum is found from 1,316 to 2,438 m (4,318 to 7,999 ft).

== Nests ==
Nests of L. apiculatum are typically located underground and have a very distinctive structure. They fill hollowed-out chambers with a branched network of carton-like material made out of agglomerated soil and oral secretions until the entire nest resembles Swiss cheese. Within the nest as many as three or four large chambers containing this honeycombed carton-like material can be found. The carton-like material of this species is much finer than that of L. uctuosum. L. apiculatum tend to nest at higher densities than do L. luctuosum. These ants are usually found nesting in dead logs, under stones, or in decaying stalks of Yucca spp. They have also been collected in glass containers and rubber tires and among the roots of various perennial xerophytes such as Agave spp., Opuntia spp., Myrtillocactus geometrizans, Yucca filifera, Senecio praecox, Schinus molle or Prosopis juliflora. In some habitats, the nests are deep under heavy boulders or large trees. The queen is always well protected and is usually in a remote place about 6–8 m (20–26 ft) from the largest chamber where the brood is stored. The chambers are connected by various galleries.

== Colonies ==
Colonies of L. apiculatum are polydomous with segments of nests (or satellite colonies) scattered over the landscape. Colonies are variable in size, ranging from a few hundred to hundreds of thousands of workers. Colonies exploited for their brood by humans contain between 65,000 and 85,000 individuals, while undisturbed colonies may contain as many as 250,000 individuals. Colonies remain useful for repeated brood collection by humans for 4 to 12 years.

Colony foundation in L. apiculatum is by haplometrosis (non-cooperative), that is, a single fertile queen founds each colony. Colony foundation behavior is not uniform among founding queens. The time spent exploring, excavating, and removing excavated materials and waste are usually higher throughout the day, while oviposition, brood care, and inactivity increase at night. Founding queens prefer sites close to bodies of water; however, sites slightly further from water are more conducive to the establishment of a successful colony as persistently high humidity will result in the early death of a colony due to fungal invasion.

== Feeding ==
Liometopum apiculatum are opportunistic carnivores and granivores, and have also been observed foraging on dead insects, larger colonies being more predaceous. L. apiculatum also feeds on crustaceans, annelids, mollusks, dead vertebrates, animal droppings, and extrafloral nectar. These ants also obtain nectar or pollen from bear grass and substances from the outside of the ovaries of the flowers of century plants (Agave scabra and Agave chisosensis) and Spanish dagger (Yucca spp.). Workers have been attracted to various foods used as baits including apple sauce, sausage, vegetable soup, sugar water, and cookies. L. apiculatum have also been observed soliciting honeydew from insects including membracids (Vanduzea segmentata), aphids, and other ants (Pogonomyrmex barbatus, Camponotus sayi and Solenopsis xyloni). In some habitats the honeydew produced by hemipterans, Cinara spp., Dysmicoccus brevipes and Saissetia oleae, are the main energy sources. In other words, hemipteran exudates make up the bulk of the diet of L. apiculatum. Their role in disrupting biological control has not been determined.

== Foraging activity ==
Liometopum apiculatum forage from March to September. Workers forage almost exclusively on trails as wide as 2–3 cm (0.8–1.2 in) on the soil surface, and when the temperature rises sharply at midday, they cease foraging and seek shelter under stones. The movement of this species is less erratic than L. occidentale at higher temperatures. An increase in temperature by 30 °C (54 °F) changes the speed 15-fold, increasing exponentially from 0.44 to 6.60 cm (0.17 to 2.60 in) per second. There also appears to be little difference in the speed whether ants are moving towards or away from the nest, or between large and small workers during the summer months. However, after prolonged periods (two months or more) of low temperatures, the larger workers are faster than the small workers. Also within a range of 14–38 °C (57–100 °F), there appears to be little effect of temperature on the number of ants on trails. Maximal activity occurs between 12 p.m. and 12 a.m during the summer months in southern alpine habitats such as Mount Wilson, California. In natural environments, ants of this species forage in areas of 468–708 m^{2} (5,040–7,620 sq ft), with an average of 612 m^{2} (6,590 sq ft); however, they only use between 16% and 30% of this area at any given time. The spatial distribution of the foraging areas for these species seems to be strongly correlated with the location of shrubs and trees infested by hemipterans.

== Reproduction ==
Immature stages of reproductives have been found in L. apiculatum nests from May to August, whereas the rest of the year the brood is of the worker caste. Males and gynes have been collected outside the nest from June to August and queens (likely founding queens) have been collected in July and August under stones and other landscape features. Nuptial flights of this species occur during the day after a heavy rain during the months of April or May. Before a nuptial flight there is a great agitation of the workers, which leave the nest and run rapidly in a "zig-zag" fashion. The male and female alates leave the nest, but are less active. After a while the workers begin to bite the legs and wings of the alates, forcing them to climb the nearest plant. The workers continue to excite the alates with bites until they begin to beat their wings, and subsequently initiate flight one by one, not as a swarm. Mating takes place in the air, and mated males and females fall to earth together, often still attached. The life span of L. apiculatum queens is shorter than that of L. luctuosum queens (exact time difference not specified); however, their productivity (oviposition) is greater.

The annual productivity for an established colony (60,000 to 85,000 workers) of L. apiculatum is about 3–3.6 kilograms (6.6–7.9 lb) of brood per year. Oviposition by founding queens is large, however, only a small percentage reaches the adult stage of the F1 generation, partly because the smaller, "trophic" eggs are consumed as food. After laying her first batch of eggs, the queen delays laying more until the first eggs have developed into pupae. Once the first workers emerge, the queen discontinues laying trophic eggs, which lowers the total number of eggs laid but increases the proportion of viable eggs. Eggs are laid all year round.

Some virgin queens of L. apiculatum emerge from the nest, remove their wings, and dig a nest without mating. They will lay eggs, care for them, and eat them to survive. However, they only care for more recently laid eggs that have not turned yellow or dried out.

== Life cycle ==
A study by Conconi et al. (1983a) recorded the longevity of each of the reproductive castes and colony foundation of L. apiculatum. In this study, they studied the life cycle of this species under different conditions of humidity, temperature, and substrate. Ant queens were placed either in glass tubes with moist cotton or in jars with soil, and were held at varying temperatures and relative humidity. Observations of the longevity of the various reproductive castes of L. apiculatum are as follows: males lived 15 to 37 days, virgin queens lived 19 to 268 days and fertilized queens lived 17 to 316 days. However, the last estimate is incredibly short for a queen, so either these ants are highly polygynous or they live much longer in the wild.
