= Liometopum venerarium =

†Liometopum venerarium Temporal range: Miocene

Scientific classification
- Kingdom: Animalia
- Phylum: Arthropoda
- Clade: Pancrustacea
- Class: Insecta
- Order: Hymenoptera
- Family: Formicidae
- Subfamily: Dolichoderinae
- Genus: Liometopum
- Species: L. venerarium

Binomial name
- Liometopum venerarium (Heer, 1864)

Species of ant

Liometopum venerarium is an extinct species of Miocene ants in the genus Liometopum. Described by Heer in 1864, fossils of the species were found in Switzerland.
