= Liometopum globosum =

†Liometopum globosum Temporal range: Miocene

Scientific classification
- Kingdom: Animalia
- Phylum: Arthropoda
- Clade: Pancrustacea
- Class: Insecta
- Order: Hymenoptera
- Family: Formicidae
- Subfamily: Dolichoderinae
- Genus: Liometopum
- Species: L. globosum

Binomial name
- Liometopum globosum (Heer, 1849)

Extinct species of ant

Liometopum globosum is an extinct species of Miocene ant in the genus Liometopum. Described by Heer in 1849, the fossils were found in Switzerland.
