= Liometopum lindgreeni =

Scientific classification
- Domain: Eukaryota
- Kingdom: Animalia
- Phylum: Arthropoda
- Class: Insecta
- Order: Hymenoptera
- Family: Formicidae
- Subfamily: Dolichoderinae
- Genus: Liometopum
- Species: L. lindgreeni

Binomial name
- Liometopum lindgreeni Forel, 1902

Species of ant

Liometopum lindgreeni is a species of ant in the genus Liometopum. Described by Forel in 1902, the species is endemic to China and India.
