= Liometopum longaevum =

†Liometopum longaevum Temporal range: Fossil

Scientific classification
- Kingdom: Animalia
- Phylum: Arthropoda
- Clade: Pancrustacea
- Class: Insecta
- Order: Hymenoptera
- Family: Formicidae
- Subfamily: Dolichoderinae
- Genus: Liometopum
- Species: L. longaevum

Binomial name
- Liometopum longaevum (Heer, 1849)

Species of ant

Liometopum longaevum is an extinct species of Miocene ant in the genus Liometopum. Described by Heer in 1849, the fossils were found in Switzerland.
