= Liometopum eremicum =

†Liometopum eremicum Temporal range: Miocene

Scientific classification
- Domain: Eukaryota
- Kingdom: Animalia
- Phylum: Arthropoda
- Class: Insecta
- Order: Hymenoptera
- Family: Formicidae
- Subfamily: Dolichoderinae
- Genus: Liometopum
- Species: L. eremicum

Binomial name
- Liometopum eremicum Zhang, 1989

Species of ant

Liometopum eremicum is an extinct species of Miocene ant in the genus Liometopum. Described by Zhang in 1989, the fossils were found in China.
