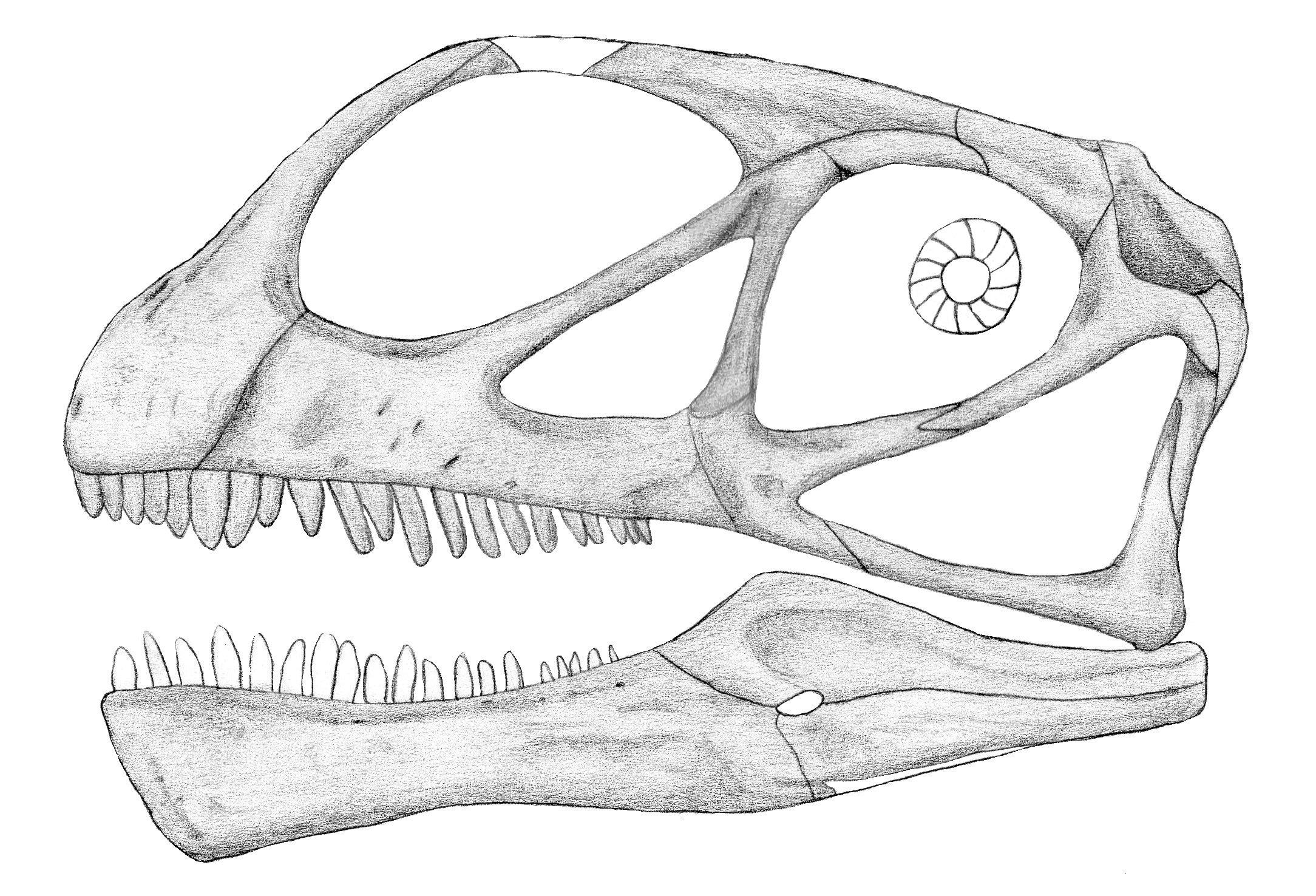
- Illustration of the skull showing known remains in gray.

Scientific classification
- Kingdom: Animalia
- Phylum: Chordata
- Class: Reptilia
- Clade: Dinosauria
- Clade: Saurischia
- Clade: †Sauropodomorpha
- Clade: †Sauropoda
- Clade: †Macronaria
- Genus: †Abrosaurus; Ouyang, 1989

Type species
- †Abrosaurus dongpoi Ouyang, 1989

= Abrosaurus =

Abrosaurus Temporal range: 168–161 Ma Middle Jurassic

Extinct genus of reptiles

Abrosaurus (/ˌæbroʊˈsɔːrəs/; 'delicate lizard' from the Greek αβρος meaning 'delicate' or 'dainty' and σαυρος meaning 'lizard') is a genus of macronarian sauropod dinosaur from the Middle Jurassic Period of what is now Asia. It is one of many dinosaurs found at the Dashanpu Quarry in the Sichuan Province of China. Like most sauropods, Abrosaurus was a quadrupedal herbivore. It was rather small for a sauropod, measuring no more than 9.1 metres (30 ft) long. Its head was boxy and topped with a tall, bony arch containing the nostrils. The generic name refers to the nature of the skull, with large openings separated by thin, bony struts. The only named species is A. dongpoi, named after eleventh-century Chinese poet Su Shi, also known as Su Dongpo, who was born in Sichuan.

== Discovery and naming ==
The naming of Abrosaurus has been a long and convoluted process. Abrosaurus was discovered in 1984 and was first described in the 1986 Ph.D. thesis of Chinese paleontologist Ouyang Hui, with the specific name "A. gigantorhinus." However, the publication does not meet ICZN standards, so "Abrosaurus gigantorhinus" is considered a nomen nudum. Despite this, it has been used incorrectly in at least one paper. Ouyang formally described this species in 1989 under the specific epithet A. dongpoensis. However, in biological nomenclature, the Latin suffix -ensis is used only to honor localities and the name has since been revised to include the more correct -i suffix, used to honor male individuals. Abrosaurus dongpoi is now the accepted name for this taxon.

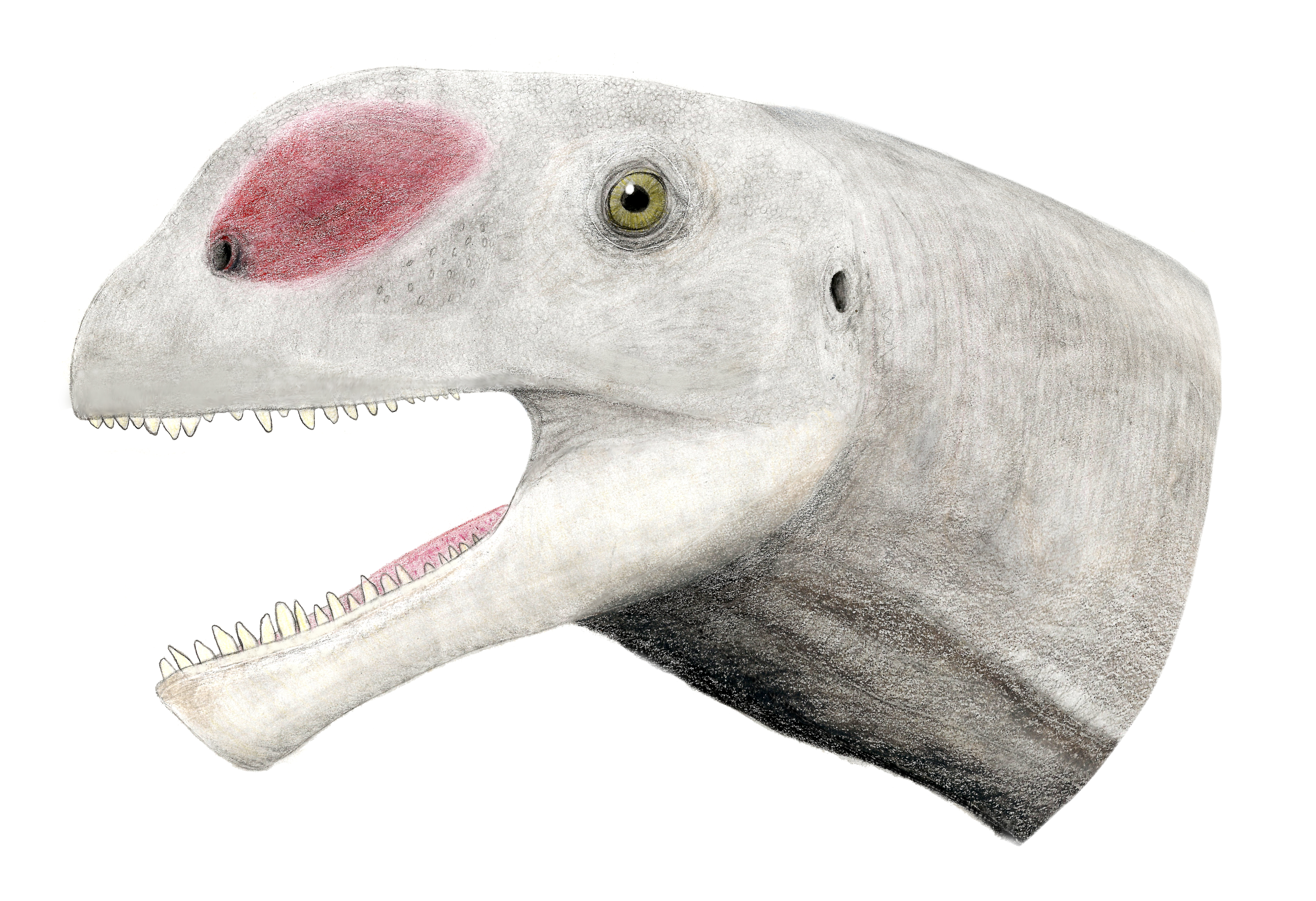
Illustration of the head of Abrosaurus

The holotype, or original specimen, of Abrosaurus, ZDM 5038, is a fossil skull which is nearly complete and very well preserved. A fragmentary skull and a skeleton have also been referred to this taxon, but published description is lacking. All of the material comes from the famous Dashanpu Quarry near Zigong in China and is housed in the dinosaur museum there. Abrosaurus and at least 4 other species of sauropod are known from the Lower Shaximiao Formation (also called Xiashaximiao) at Dashanpu. These sediments are dated from the Bathonian to Callovian stages of the Middle Jurassic Period, or about 168 to 161 million years ago.

== Classification ==
Abrosaurus was originally described as a camarasaurid sauropod, and while it may not turn out to be a member of that particular family, further research has indicated that it is a basal member of Macronaria, much like Camarasaurus itself. However, the remains of Abrosaurus have not been fully described, making its exact placement in the sauropod family tree difficult to determine.
