= Shanwang National Geological Park =

National park in China

Coordinates: 36°33′N 118°44′E

Shanwang Formation
- Stratigraphic range: Middle Miocene (Langhian to Serravallian); ~18.22–11.63 Ma
- Type: Sedimentary
- Overlies: Niushan Formation

Lithology
- Primary: Tuff, diatomite, shale, mudstone
- Other: Basalt, phosphorite, oil shale, basanite

Location
- Region: Shandong
- Country: China

Type section
- Named for: Shanwang, China

The Shanwang National Geology Park (simplified Chinese: 山旺国家地质公园; traditional Chinese: 山旺國家地質公園; pinyin: Shānwàng Guójiā Dìzhì Gōngyuán) is located in central Shandong province, People's Republic of China, about 22 kilometres (14 mi) from Linqu County. It has an area of about 13 square kilometres (5.0 sq mi). The Park is well known for the fossil bearing Shanwang Formation diatomitic deposits, one of only a few such deposits in China. It is also well known for its volcanic topography. The Shanwang Formation dates to about 18-11 million years ago, from the Langhian to the Serravallian.

== Fossils ==
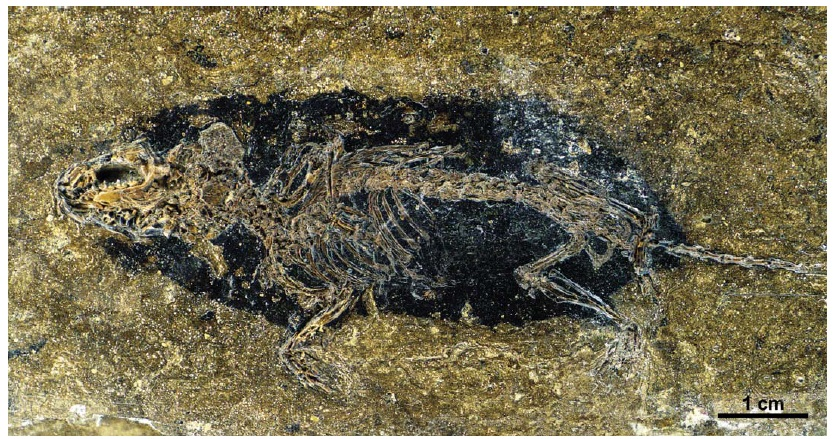
Lusorex taishanensis (Early–middle Miocene)

The fossils are found in the early-mid Miocene Shanwang Formation diatomite beds and are approximately 17 million years old. They are noted for the prolific number of specimens found and the diversity of the species recovered, as well as the remarkable state of their preservation. The fine grained diatomite strata have led to exquisite preservation of external body features such as outlines of skin, hair, scales and feathers, rarely seen elsewhere in the world. Fossils have been found in a dozen categories, representing over 600 separate species. Animal fossils include insects, fish, spiders, amphibians, reptiles, birds and mammals. Insect fossils have clear, intact veins. Some have retained beautiful colours. Those studied to date include 11 orders, 46 families, 100 genera and 182 species. Fossil birds recovered at Shanwang are the most abundant and best-preserved found so far in China. Fossils of ancient deer and bear are among the best-preserved from this period of time found anywhere in the world. Plant fossils include moss, fern, gymnosperm, and angiosperm species. In addition to 100 species of algae, other plant species are from 46 families, 98 genera and 143 species.
