= Eociconia =

Eociconia Temporal range: Eocene

Scientific classification
- Kingdom: Animalia
- Phylum: Chordata
- Class: Aves
- Order: Ciconiiformes
- Family: Ciconiidae
- Genus: †Eociconia; Hou, 1989
- Species: †E. sangequanensis

Binomial name
- †Eociconia sangequanensis Hou, 1989

Extinct genus of birds

Eociconia is an extinct genus of primitive stork, and one of the earliest members of Ciconiiformes. The holotype, which is a metatarsus, was found in Yixibaila Formation of Xinjiang, China, dated back to the Eocene period.
