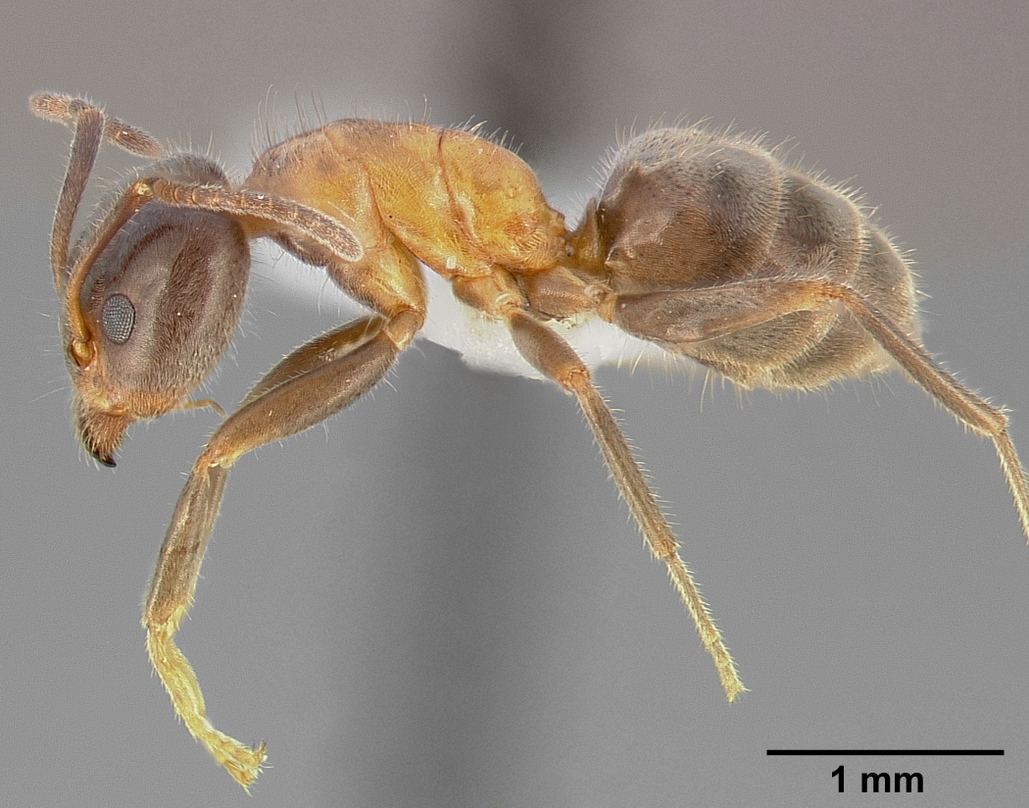
- L. occidentale worker from the United States
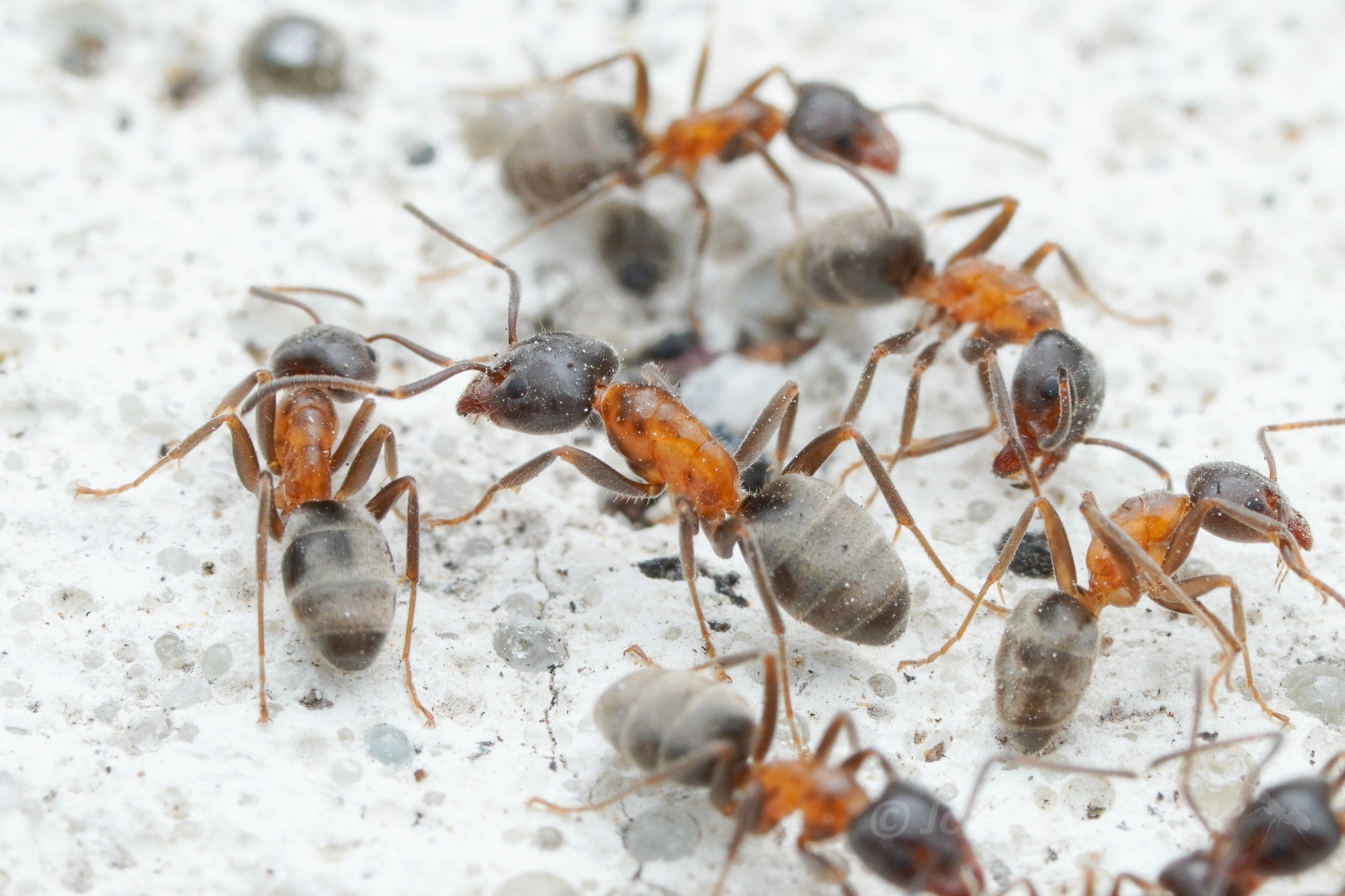

Scientific classification
- Kingdom: Animalia
- Phylum: Arthropoda
- Clade: Pancrustacea
- Class: Insecta
- Order: Hymenoptera
- Family: Formicidae
- Subfamily: Dolichoderinae
- Genus: Liometopum
- Species: L. occidentale

Binomial name
- Liometopum occidentale Emery, 1895

= Liometopum occidentale =

Velvety tree ant

Species of ant

Liometopum occidentale, also called the velvety tree ant, is a species of ant in the subfamily Dolichoderinae. Liometopum occidentale is often mistaken for carpenter ants (Camponotus spp.) by homeowners and pest management professionals. This mistaken identity is due to morphological and behavioral characteristics they share with carpenter ants; namely polymorphic workers, a smooth convex thoracic profile, and the tendency to excavate wood. Consequently, their importance as structural pests may be greatly underreported, especially in California, Oregon, and Washington, United States.

== Taxonomy ==
Liometopum occidentale was originally described as Liometopum microcephalum var. occidentale by Emery (1895). Wheeler (1905) relocated it to a variety of Liometopum apiculatum. It was finally elevated to the species level by Wheeler (1917) and remained there in a recent taxonomic review by Del Toro et al. (2009).

== Habitat ==
Liometopum occidentale is found from sea level to over 1840 m in coastal regions from southern Washington to northern Mexico. The range of elevation of this species also appears to depend on latitude, with ants collected from locations in Oregon as low as 7 m and up to 1700 m in California. They are the most common and dominant ant in oak and pine forests of the southwestern U.S. They prefer to nest in the crevices of oaks, alders, elms, cottonwoods, and creosote, in soil, and underneath the bark of dead trees.

== Colonies ==
After finding no aggression between workers collected from significant distances apart and no territorial boundary, Wang et al. (2010) speculated that L. occidentale colonies are large and polydomous. Since they never found brood or queens, it is uncertain whether there are multiple queens within a nest, or whether each queen has some localized "sphere of exclusivity." Due to the apparent unlikelihood that a single queen could produce enough eggs to establish a colony one kilometer wide, they also speculated that L. occidentale are polygyne. Colonies have been estimated to contain between 40,000 and 60,000 workers. Colony foundation of this species has not been studied as well as it has with the other two North American species.

== Nests ==
Liometopum occidentale typically nest in soil, crevices of trees, and under the bark of dead trees. However, nests were never found by Wang et al. (2010), leading to the speculation that they must lie deep under large boulders or among roots of large trees. To better understand the structure of their nests, more nests need to be excavated.

== Feeding ==
Liometopum occidentale are opportunistic omnivores and can often be found tending hemipterans and carrying prey insects back to the nest. They readily attend hemipterans and are found in citrus groves, but their role in disrupting biological control has not been determined. Their feeding preferences need to be studied to enable the development of an effective bait for pest control purposes.

== Foraging activity ==
Liometopum occidentale form massive foraging trails that extend 60 m or more from the nest, and can even be observed on hot days with temperatures between 24 and 38°C. Ramos-Elorduy & Levieux (1992) observed L. occidentale traveling mostly underground in very shallow galleries (1–2 cm deep), or in leaf litter; however, massive above-ground trails have also been observed. According to Ramos-Elorduy & Levieux (1992), L. occidentale in natural environments forage in areas as large as 2,000 m^{2}, but they only utilize between 486 and 1198 m^{2} (740 m^{2} average) of this area at any one time. This means that they are only using between 33 and 68% of this area, more than twice that of L. apiculatum.

== Reproduction ==
Nuptial flight of L. occidentale reproductives have been observed throughout May. The annual productivity for a colony (40,000 to 60,000 workers) of this species is 2 to 2.8 kg of brood per year for 4–8 years. Workers housed without a queen will also lay unfertilized eggs that are eaten or develop into males.
