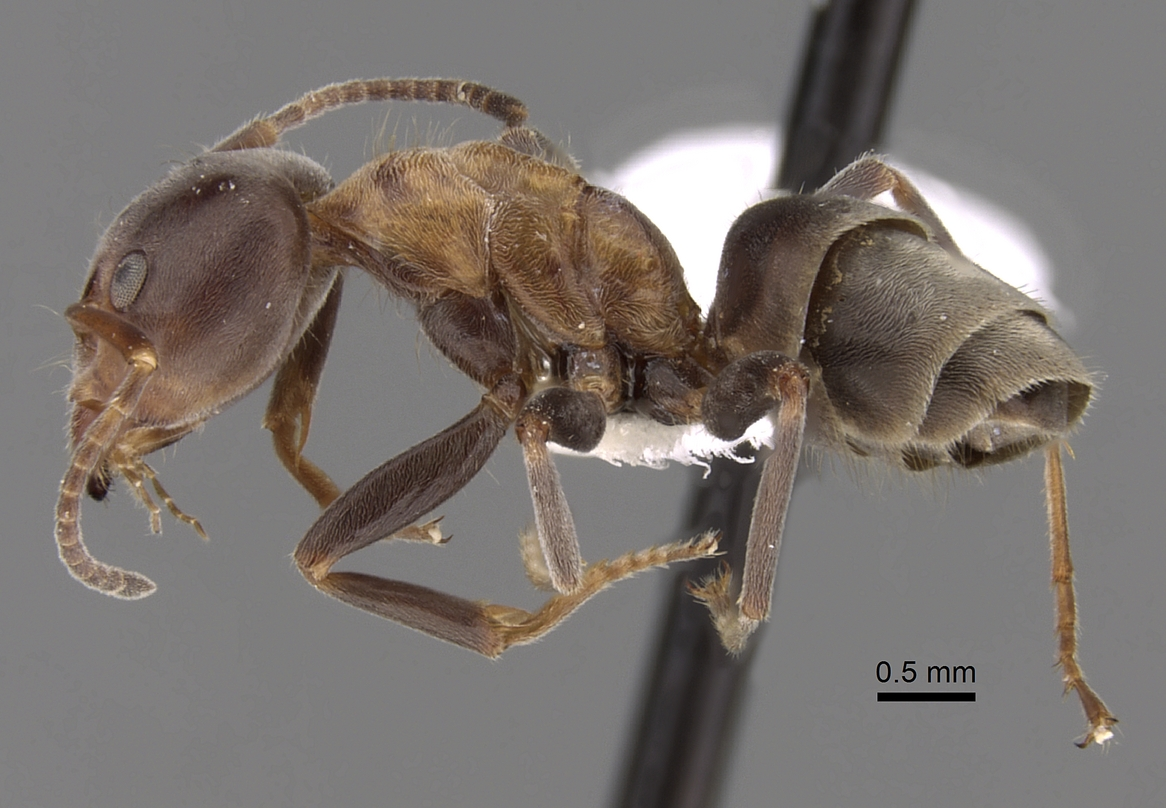

Scientific classification
- Domain: Eukaryota
- Kingdom: Animalia
- Phylum: Arthropoda
- Class: Insecta
- Order: Hymenoptera
- Family: Formicidae
- Subfamily: Dolichoderinae
- Genus: Liometopum
- Species: L. microcephalum

Binomial name
- Liometopum microcephalum (Panzer, 1798)

Synonyms
- Formica austriaca Mayr, 1853

= Liometopum microcephalum =

Species of ant

Liometopum microcephalum is a species of ant in the genus Liometopum. Described by Panzer in 1798, the species is endemic to Europe.
