= Liometopum potamophilum =

†Liometopum potamophilum Temporal range: Miocene

Scientific classification
- Domain: Eukaryota
- Kingdom: Animalia
- Phylum: Arthropoda
- Class: Insecta
- Order: Hymenoptera
- Family: Formicidae
- Subfamily: Dolichoderinae
- Genus: Liometopum
- Species: L. potamophilum

Binomial name
- Liometopum potamophilum Zhang, 1989

Species of ant

Liometopum potamophilum is an extinct species of Miocene ant in the genus Liometopum. Described by Zhang in 1989, the fossils were found in China.
