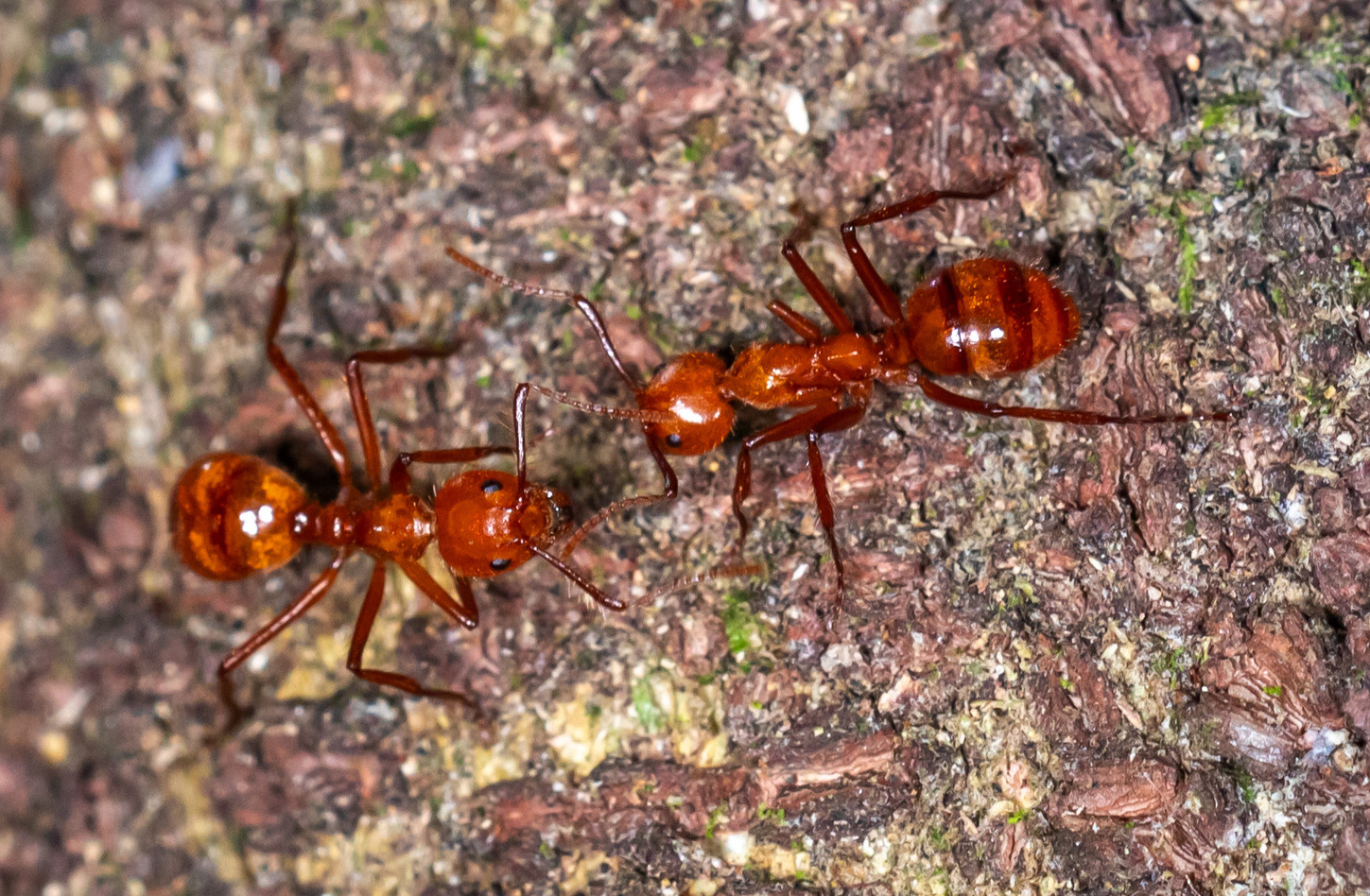

Scientific classification
- Kingdom: Animalia
- Phylum: Arthropoda
- Class: Insecta
- Order: Hymenoptera
- Family: Formicidae
- Subfamily: Dolichoderinae
- Genus: Dolichoderus
- Species: D. abruptus

Binomial name
- Dolichoderus abruptus (Smith, F., 1858)

Synonyms
- Hypoclinea ursus Mayr, 1866

= Dolichoderus abruptus =

Species of ant

Dolichoderus abruptus is a species of ant in the genus Dolichoderus. Described by Smith in 1858, the species is endemic to Bolivia, Brazil, Colombia, Ecuador and Peru.

== Description ==
Specimens of Dolichoderus abruptus have a heart-shaped head, poorly formed propodeal angles and a petiole with two well-developed teeth. It has numerous long, erect hairs, but a small amount of short, fine hairs (pubescence). It also has a smooth, shiny gaster.

=== Similarities with other species ===
Dolichoderus abruptus is similar to D. ferrugineus in color, hair and pubescence arrangement, but differs in its smooth and shiny gastrula, which is slightly spotted in the case of D. ferrugineus.

It can also be confused with D. quadridenticulatus due to the shape of its head and its size, but it can be distinguished by its lighter, golden color.
