= List of ants of Australia =

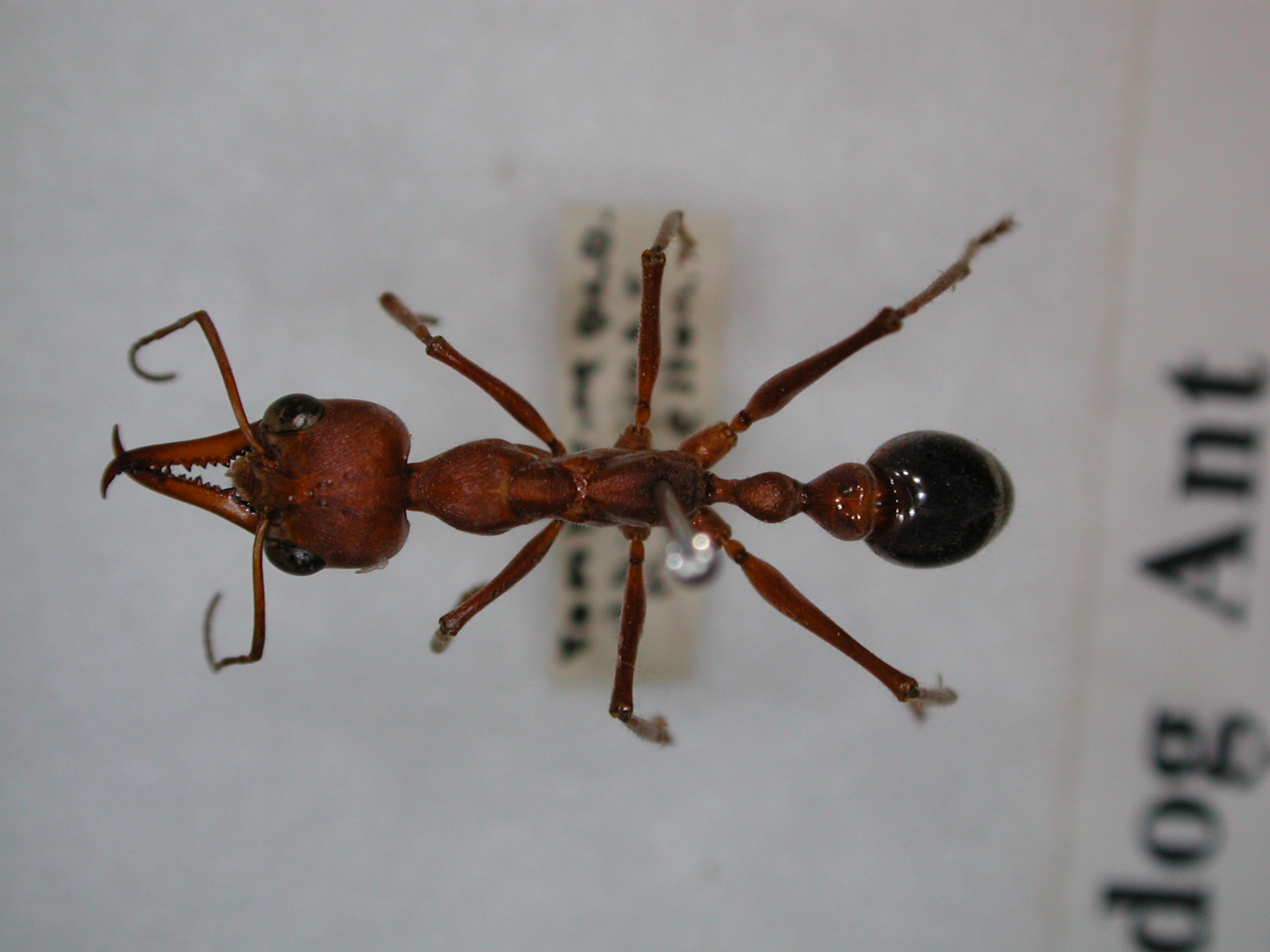
The bulldog ant Myrmecia brevinoda is the largest ant in the world in terms of average worker size

The ant fauna of Australia is large and diverse. As of 1999, Australia and its external territories represent 1,275 described taxa (subspecies included) divided into 103 genera and 10 subfamilies. No publication since 1999 has estimated the current diversity of Australia's ant fauna, although it has considerably increased in size as the total amount of subfamilies in Australia today is around twelve. Very few species in the country are known to be invasive.

Australia is home to two-thirds of the world's subfamilies, one-third of known genera, 15% of all described species, and some genera found in Australia can be found nowhere else or they are found in neighboring countries instead. Australia's ant diversity is smaller than Central America, South America and Southeast Asia, it has roughly the same number of genera and species as the Orient and surpasses the amount of ants known in Europe, North America, Northern Asia and Northern Africa. The state of Queensland has the greatest diversity of ants in the world, with more than 1,400 species known within its borders. The total amount of species known in Australia could possibly be over 6,500, with only one in five ants being described.

== Subfamilies ==
In 1999, 10 ant subfamilies were known to reside in Australia, but some of these subfamilies were later synonymised under the subfamily Dorylinae. Today, 12 subfamilies are known to occur in Australia, including Amblyoponinae, Dolichoderinae, Dorylinae, Ectatomminae, Formicinae, Heteroponerinae, Leptanillinae, Myrmeciinae, Myrmicinae, Ponerinae, Proceratiinae and Pseudomyrmecinae.

The subfamily Myrmicinae is the largest in Australia in terms of both number of genera and species, as well as the subfamily Formicinae, which is also one of the most common subfamily of ants to be encountered. The subfamily Myrmeciinae consists of two genera which are only found in Australia, with the exception of a single species native to New Caledonia. Only a single species of the subfamily Leptanillinae is known from Australia.

== Acropyga ==
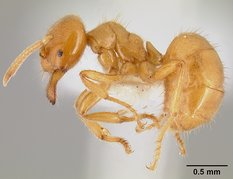
Acropyga acutiventris

- Acropyga acutiventris Roger, 1862
- Acropyga myops Forel, 1910
- Acropyga pallida (Donisthorpe, 1938)

== Adlerzia ==
- Adlerzia froggatti (Forel, 1902) – Thumbelina ant

== Aenictus ==
- Aenictus acerbus Shattuck, 2008
- Aenictus aratus Forel, 1900 – Black lesser army ant
- Aenictus diclops Shattuck, 2008
- Aenictus hilli Clark, 1928
- Aenictus nesiotis Wheeler and Chapman, 1930
- Aenictus philiporum Wilson, 1964
- Aenictus prolixus Shattuck, 2008
- Aenictus turneri Forel, 1900

== Amblyopone ==
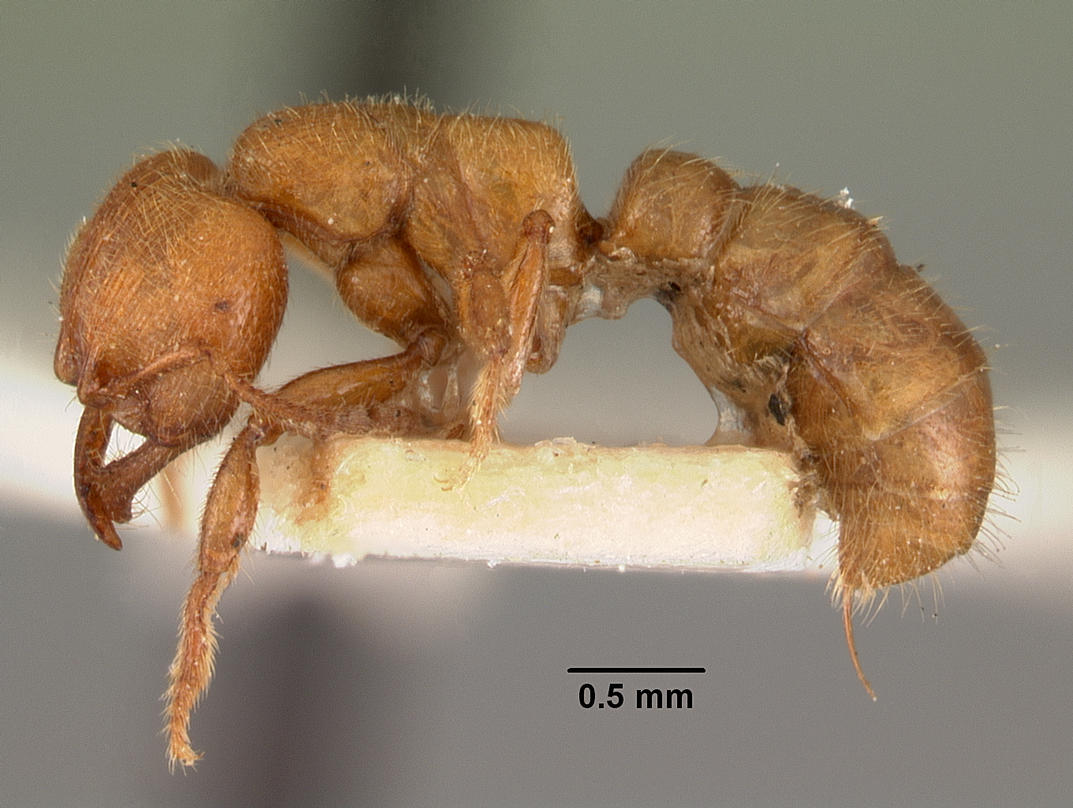
Amblyopone aberrans

- Amblyopone aberrans Wheeler, 1927
- Amblyopone australis Erichson, 1842 – Southern Michelin ant
- Amblyopone clarki Wheeler, 1927
- Amblyopone ferruginea Smith, 1858
- Amblyopone gingivalis Brown, 1960
- Amblyopone hackeri Wheeler, 1927
- Amblyopone leae Wheeler, 1927
- Amblyopone longidens Forel, 1910
- Amblyopone mercovichi Brown, 1960
- Amblyopone michaelseni Forel, 1907

== Anochetus ==
References:

- Anochetus alae Shattuck & Slipinska, 2012
- Anochetus armstrongi McAreavey, 1949
- Anochetus avius Shattuck & Slipinska, 2012
- Anochetus graeffei Mayr, 1870
- Anochetus isolatus Mann, 1919
- Anochetus paripungens Brown, 1978
- Anochetus rectangularis Mayr, 1876
- Anochetus renatae Shattuck & Slipinska, 2012
- Anochetus rufolatus Shattuck & Slipinska, 2012
- Anochetus rufostenus Shattuck & Slipinska, 2012
- Anochetus turneri Forel, 1900
- Anochetus veronicae Shattuck & Slipinska, 2012
- Anochetus victoriae Shattuck & Slipinska, 2012
- Anochetus wiesiae Shattuck & Slipinska, 2012

== Anonychomyrma ==
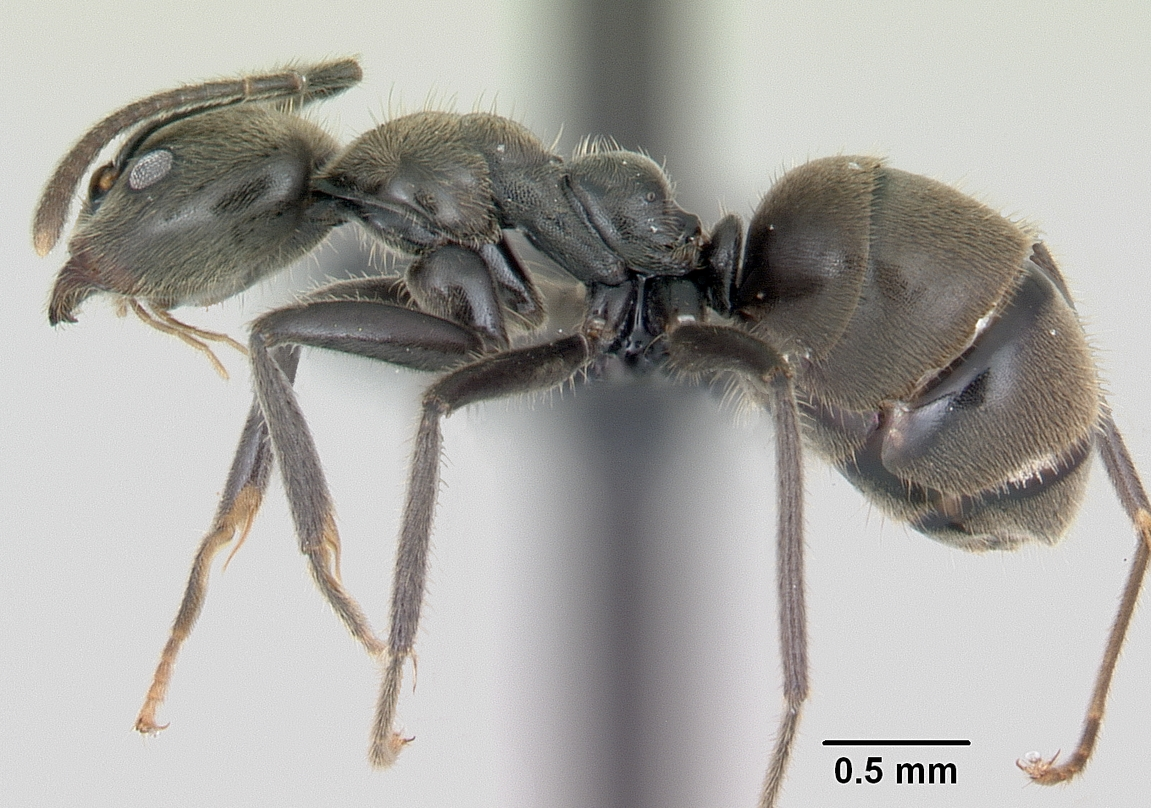
Anonychomyrma gilberti

References:

- Anonychomyrma arcadia (Forel, 1915)
- Anonychomyrma biconvexa (Santschi, 1928) – Forest black cocktail ant
- Anonychomyrma fornicata (Emery, 1914)
- Anonychomyrma froggatti (Forel, 1902)
- Anonychomyrma gilberti (Forel, 1902) – Golden-black cocktail ant
- Anonychomyrma itinerans (Lowne, 1865)
- Anonychomyrma longiceps (Forel, 1907)
- Anonychomyrma malandana (Forel, 1915)
- Anonychomyrma nitidiceps (André, 1896)
- Anonychomyrma procidua (Erichson, 1842)
- Anonychomyrma purpurescens (Lowne, 1865)

== Anoplolepis ==
References:

- Anoplolepis gracilipes (Smith, 1857) – introduced species – Crazy ant

== Aphaenogaster ==
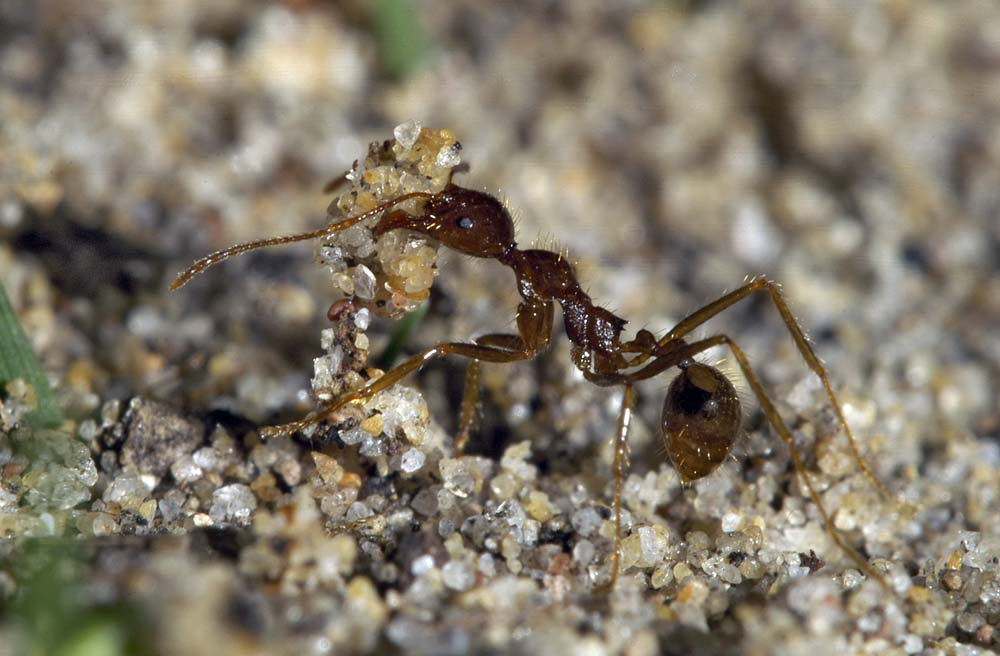
Aphaenogaster longiceps

- Aphaenogaster barbara Shattuck, 2008
- Aphaenogaster barbigula Wheeler, 1916 – Desert funnel ant
- Aphaenogaster kimberleyensis Shattuck, 2008
- Aphaenogaster longiceps (Smith, 1858) – Forest funnel ant
- Aphaenogaster mediterrae Shattuck, 2008
- Aphaenogaster poultoni Crawley, 1922
- Aphaenogaster pythia Forel, 1915
- Aphaenogaster reichelae Shattuck, 2008

== Arnoldius ==
- Arnoldius flavus (Crawley, 1922)
- Arnoldius pusillus (Mayr, 1876)
- Arnoldius scissor (Crawley, 1922)

== Austromorium ==
- Austromorium flavigaster (Clark, 1938)
- Austromorium hetericki Shattuck, 2009

== Austroponera ==
References:

- Austroponera rufonigra (Clark, 1934)

== Brachyponera ==
- Brachyponera croceicornis (Emery, 1900)
- Brachyponera lutea (Mayr, 1862)

== Calomyrmex ==
References:

- Calomyrmex albertisi (Emery, 1887)
- Calomyrmex albopilosus (Mayr, 1876)
- Calomyrmex glauerti Clark, 1930
- Calomyrmex impavidus (Forel, 1893) – Black beauty ant
- Calomyrmex purpureus (Mayr, 1876) – Speckled beauty ant
- Calomyrmex similis (Mayr, 1876)
- Calomyrmex splendidus (Mayr, 1876) – Bauble beauty ant

== Calyptomyrmex ==
- Calyptomyrmex beccarii Emery, 1887
- Calyptomyrmex fragarus Shattuck, 2011
- Calyptomyrmex fritillus Shattuck, 2011
- Calyptomyrmex grammus Shattuck, 2011
- Calyptomyrmex lineolus Shattuck, 2011
- Calyptomyrmex ocullatus Shattuck, 2011
- Calyptomyrmex sparsus Shattuck, 2011
- Calyptomyrmex taylori Shattuck, 2011

== Camponotus ==
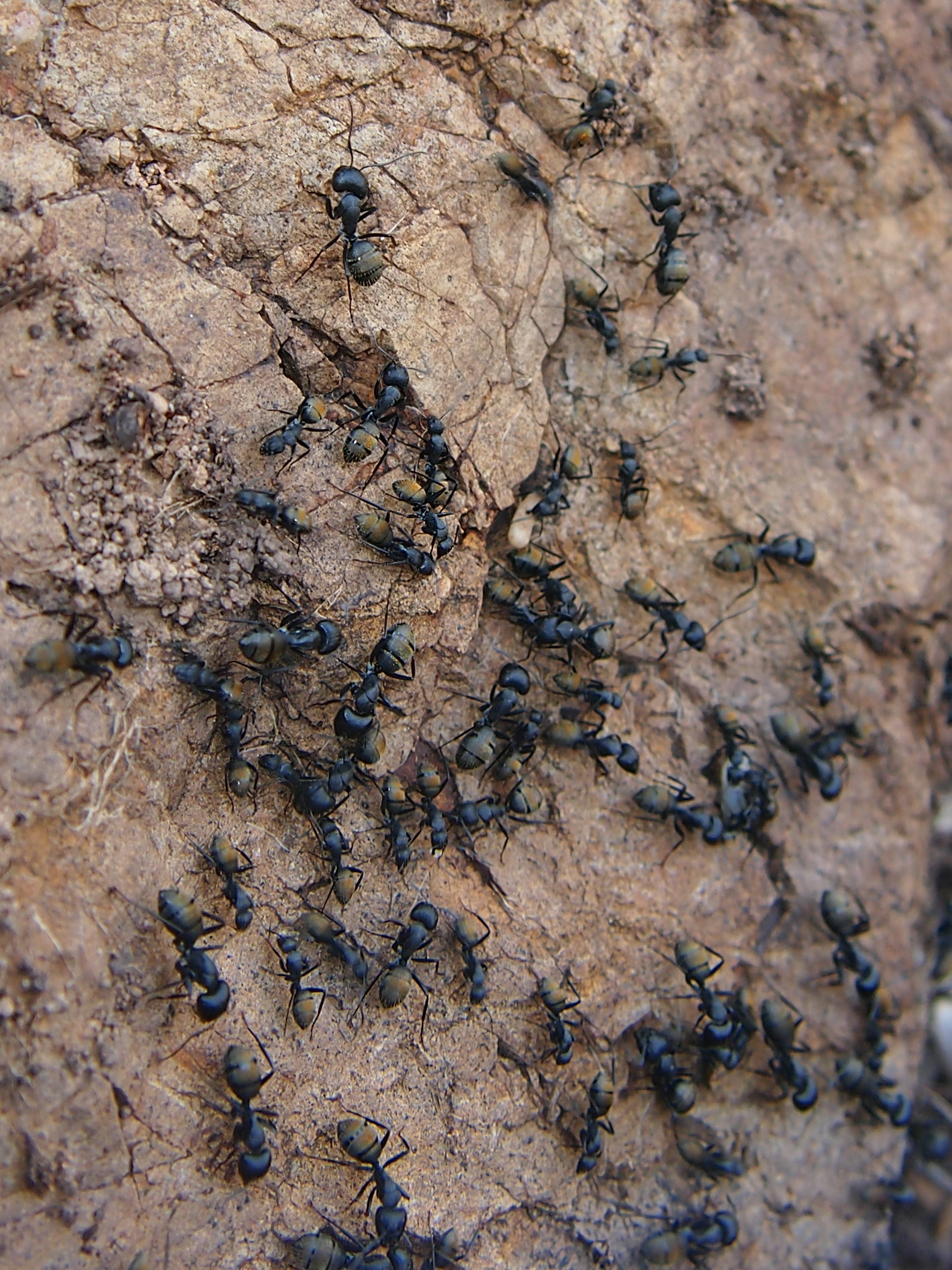
Camponotus aeneopilosus

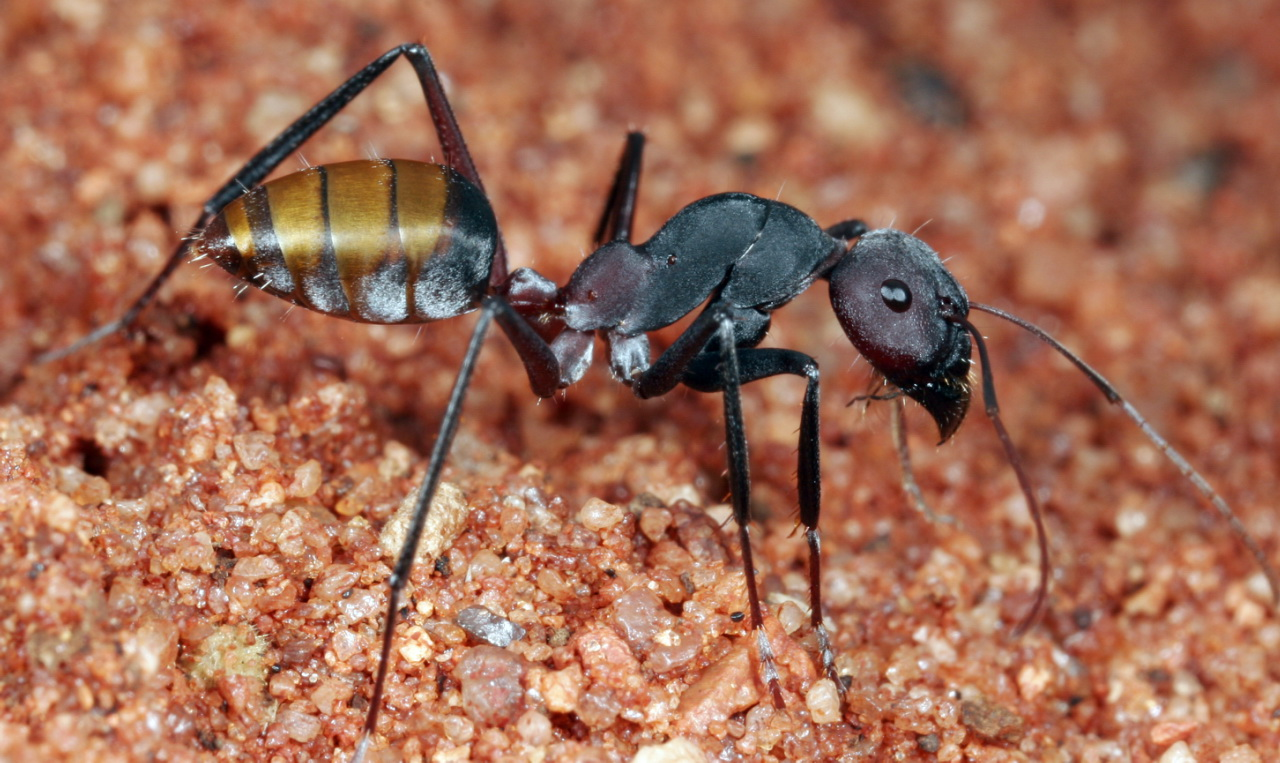
Camponotus aurocinctus

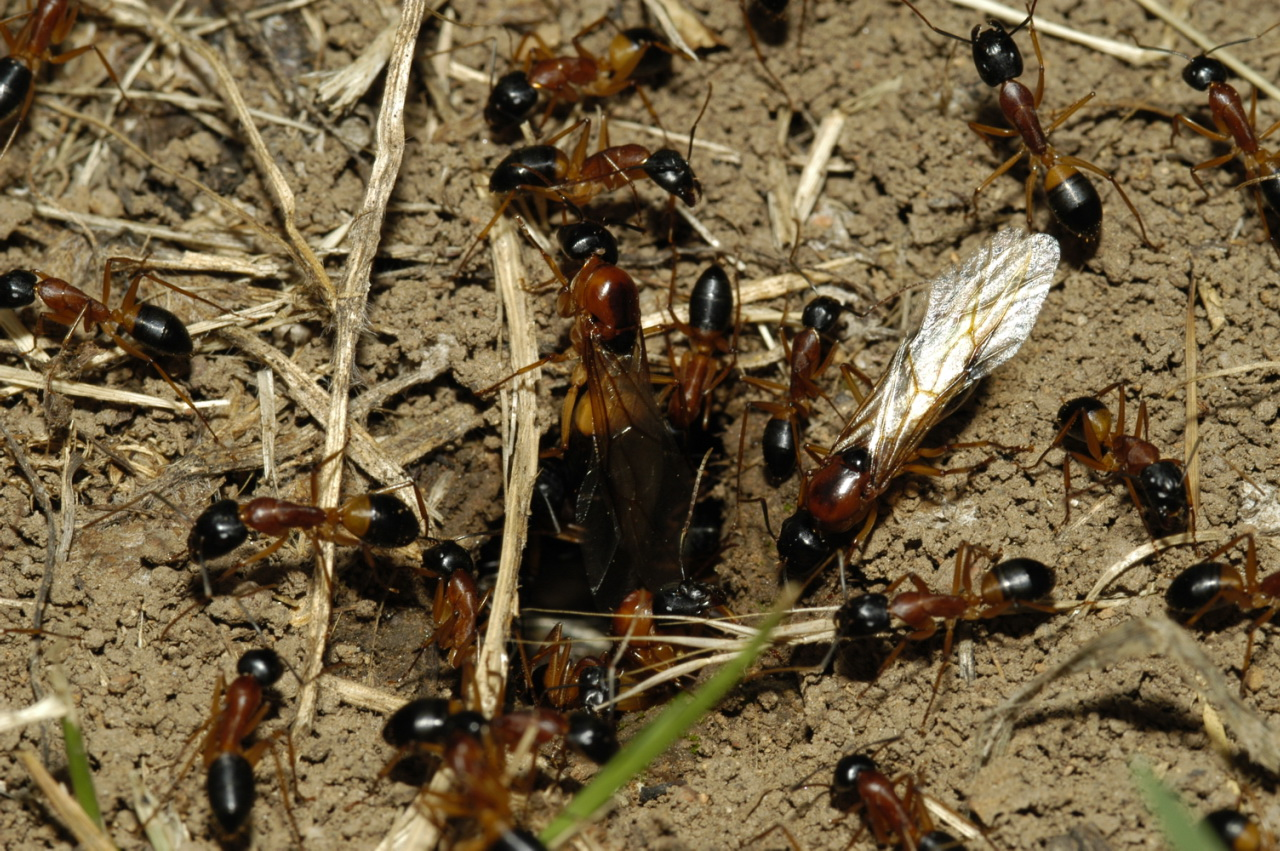
Camponotus consobrinus

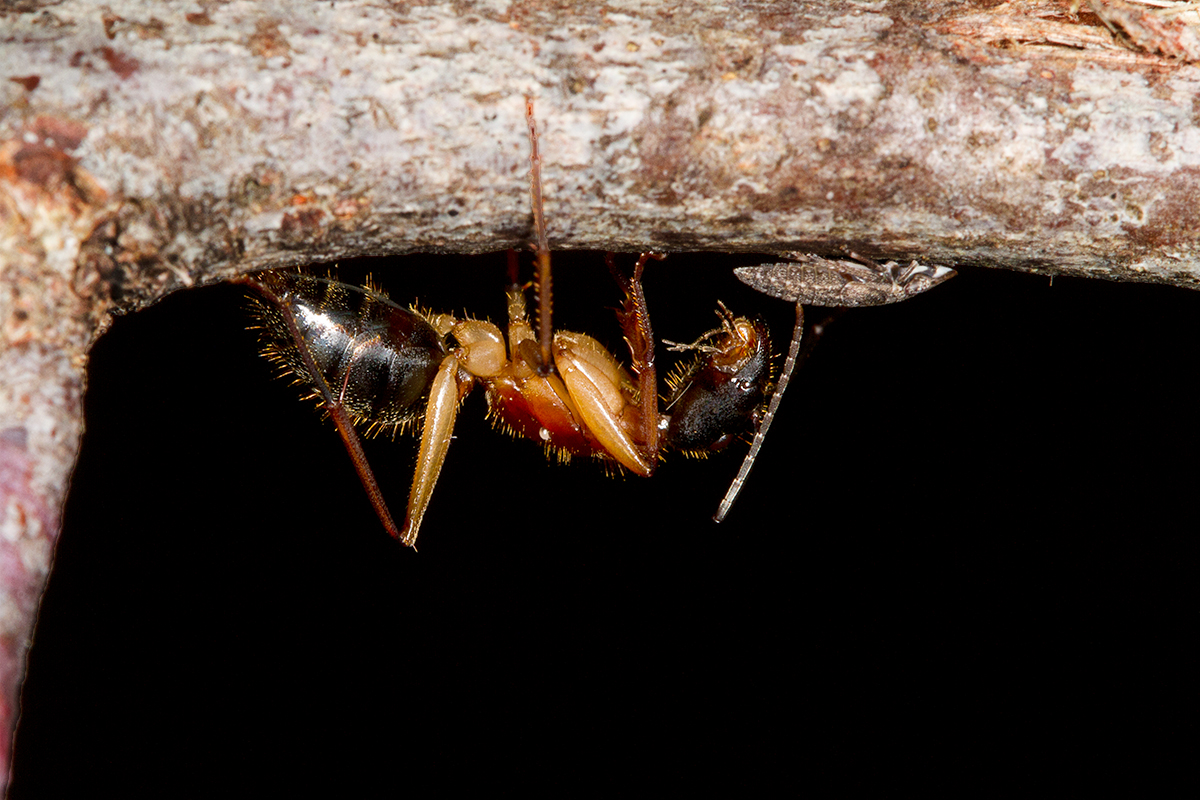
Camponotus nigriceps

References:

- Camponotus adami Forel, 1910
- Camponotus aeneopilosus Mayr, 1862 – Golden-tailed sugar ant
- Camponotus afflatus Viehmeyer, 1925
- Camponotus anderseni McArthur & Shattuck, 2001
- Camponotus andyyoungi McArthur, 2008
- Camponotus annetteae McArthur & Shattuck, 2001
- Camponotus arcuatus Mayr, 1876
- Camponotus arenatus Shattuck & McArthur, 2002
- Camponotus armstrongi McAreavey, 1949
- Camponotus aurocinctus (Smith, 1858) – Golden bearded sugar ant
- Camponotus bigenus Santschi, 1919
- Camponotus cameratus Viehmeyer, 1925
- Camponotus capito Mayr, 1876
- Camponotus ceriseipes Clark, 1938 – Southern bearded sugar ant
- Camponotus chalceoides Clark, 1938
- Camponotus chalceus Crawley, 1915
- Camponotus chloroticus Emery, 1897
- Camponotus christmasensis McArthur, 2008
- Camponotus churchetti McArthur, 2008
- Camponotus cinereus Mayr, 1876 – Mallee black sugar ant
- Camponotus clarior Forel, 1902
- Camponotus claripes Mayr, 1876 – Pale legged sugar ant
- Camponotus conithorax Emery, 1914
- Camponotus consectator (Smith, 1858)
- Camponotus consobrinus (Erichson, 1842) – Banded sugar ant/Sugar ant
- Camponotus cowlei Froggatt, 1896
- Camponotus crenatus Mayr, 1876
- Camponotus crozieri McArthur & Leys, 2006
- Camponotus darlingtoni Wheeler, 1934
- Camponotus discors Forel, 1902 – Yellow disc sugar ants
- Camponotus donnellani Shattuck & McArthur, 2002
- Camponotus dromas Santschi, 1919
- Camponotus dryandrae McArthur & Adams, 1996
- Camponotus eastwoodi McArthur & Adams, 1996
- Camponotus elegans Forel, 1902
- Camponotus ephippium (Smith, 1858) – Jumbuck sugar ant
- Camponotus eremicus Wheeler, 1915
- Camponotus esau Forel, 1915
- Camponotus evae Forel, 1910 – Black disc sugar ant
- Camponotus extensus Mayr, 1876
- Camponotus ezotus Bolton, 1995
- Camponotus fergusoni McArthur, 2003
- Camponotus fieldeae Forel, 1902
- Camponotus fieldellus Forel, 1910
- Camponotus fraseri McArthur, 2008
- Camponotus froggatti Forel, 1902
- Camponotus gasseri (Forel, 1894) – Southern plug ant
- Camponotus gibbinotus Forel, 1902
- Camponotus gouldianus Forel, 1922
- Camponotus guidae McArthur, 2007
- Camponotus hartogi Forel, 1902
- Camponotus horni Clark, 1930
- Camponotus howensis Wheeler, 1927 – Lord Howe Island rectangle plug ant
- Camponotus humilior Forel, 1902 – Household sugar ant
- Camponotus inflatus Lubbock, 1880 – Australian honey-pot ant
- Camponotus innexus Forel, 1902 – Antarctic sugar ant
- Camponotus insipidus Forel, 1893
- Camponotus intrepidus (Kirby, 1818) – Coastal flumed sugar ant
- Camponotus janeti Forel, 1895
- Camponotus janforrestae McArthur & Shattuck, 2001
- Camponotus johnclarki Taylor, 1992
- Camponotus judithmorrisae McArthur, 2008
- Camponotus leae Wheeler, 1915
- Camponotus lividicoxis Viehmeyer, 1925
- Camponotus longideclivis McArthur & Adams, 1995
- Camponotus longifacies McArthur, 2003
- Camponotus loweryi McArthur & Adams, 1996
- Camponotus lownei Forel, 1895
- Camponotus macareaveyi Taylor, 1992
- Camponotus mackayensis Forel, 1902
- Camponotus malleensis McArthur, 2007
- Camponotus marcens Forel, 1907
- Camponotus michaelseni Forel, 1907
- Camponotus minimus Crawley, 1922
- Camponotus molossus Forel, 1907 – Western flumed sugar ant
- Camponotus nigriceps (Smith, 1858) – Black-headed sugar ant
- Camponotus nigroaeneus (Smith, 1858) – Southern black sugar ant
- Camponotus novaehollandiae Mayr, 1870 – Northern common sugar ant
- Camponotus oetkeri Forel, 1910
- Camponotus owensae Shattuck & McArthur, 2002
- Camponotus oxleyi Forel, 1902
- Camponotus palkura McArthur, 2007
- Camponotus pallidiceps Emery, 1887
- Camponotus pawseyi McArthur, 2003
- Camponotus pellax Santschi, 1919 – Silver sugar ant
- Camponotus perjurus Shattuck & McArthur, 2002
- Camponotus peseshus Bolton, 1995
- Camponotus philwardi McArthur, 2008
- Camponotus piliventris (Smith, 1858)
- Camponotus pitjantjatarae McArthur, 2003
- Camponotus postcornutus Clark, 1930
- Camponotus prosseri Shattuck & McArthur, 2002
- Camponotus prostans Forel, 1910 – Western sugar ant
- Camponotus punctiventris Emery, 1920
- Camponotus rubiginosus Mayr, 1876 – Coconut sugar ants
- Camponotus rudis McArthur, 2003
- Camponotus rufonigrus Shattuck & McArthur, 2002
- Camponotus rufus Crawley, 1925
- Camponotus samueli McArthur, 2008
- Camponotus sanguinifrons Viehmeyer, 1925
- Camponotus scotti McArthur, 2003
- Camponotus scratius Forel, 1907
- Camponotus setosus Shattuck & McArthur, 2002
- Camponotus simpsoni McArthur, 2003
- Camponotus simulator Forel, 1915
- Camponotus spenceri Clark, 1930
- Camponotus spinitarsus Emery, 1920
- Camponotus sponsorum Forel, 1910
- Camponotus stefani McArthur, 2007
- Camponotus subnitidus Mayr, 1876 – Aerial sugar ant
- Camponotus suffusus (Smith, 1858) – Golden flumed sugar ant
- Camponotus tasmani Forel, 1902
- Camponotus terebrans (Lowne, 1865) – Brown bearded sugar ant
- Camponotus thadeus Shattuck, 2005
- Camponotus tricoloratus Clark, 1941
- Camponotus triodiae McArthur, 2009
- Camponotus tristis Clark, 1930
- Camponotus tumidus Crawley, 1922
- Camponotus versicolor Clark, 1930
- Camponotus vitreus (Smith, 1860) – Common northern plug ant
- Camponotus walkeri Forel, 1893
- Camponotus whitei Wheeler, 1915 – Common armoured sugar ant
- Camponotus wiederkehri Forel, 1894 – Moneybox sugar ant
- Camponotus woodroffeensis McArthur, 2008
- Camponotus xuthus Emery, 1925

== Cardiocondyla ==
References:

- Cardiocondyla atalanta Forel, 1915
- Cardiocondyla emeryi Forel, 1881
- Cardiocondyla nuda (Mayr, 1866)
- Cardiocondyla thoracica (Smith, 1859)
- Cardiocondyla wroughtonii (Forel, 1890)

== Carebara ==
References:

- Carebara affinis (Jerdon, 1851)
- Carebara atoma (Emery, 1900)
- Carebara cornigera (Forel, 1902)
- Carebara crassiuscula (Emery, 1900)
- Carebara mjobergi (Forel, 1915)
- Carebara norfolkensis (Donisthorpe, 1941)

== Colobopsis ==
- Colobopsis macrocephala (Erichson, 1842) – Southern rectangle plug ant
- Colobopsis explodens

== Colobostruma ==
References:

- Colobostruma alinodis (Forel, 1913)
- Colobostruma australis Brown, 1959
- Colobostruma biconcava Shattuck, 2000
- Colobostruma biconvexa Shattuck, 2000
- Colobostruma bicorna Shattuck, 2000
- Colobostruma cerornata Brown, 1959
- Colobostruma elliotti (Clark, 1928)
- Colobostruma froggatti (Forel, 1913)
- Colobostruma lacuna Shattuck, 2000
- Colobostruma leae (Wheeler, 1927)
- Colobostruma mellea Shattuck, 2000
- Colobostruma nancyae Brown, 1965
- Colobostruma papulata Brown, 1965
- Colobostruma sisypha Shattuck, 2000
- Colobostruma unicorna Shattuck, 2000

== Crematogaster ==
References:

- Crematogaster australis Mayr, 1876 – Valentine ant
- Crematogaster cornigera Forel, 1902
- Crematogaster dispar Forel, 1902
- Crematogaster eurydice Forel, 1915
- Crematogaster frivola Forel, 1902
- Crematogaster fusca Mayr, 1876
- Crematogaster kutteri Viehmeyer, 1924
- Crematogaster laeviceps Smith, 1858 – Common valentine ant
- Crematogaster longicephala Özdikmen, 2010
- Crematogaster mjobergi Forel, 1915
- Crematogaster pallida Lowne, 1865
- Crematogaster pallipes Mayr, 1862
- Crematogaster pythia Forel, 1915
- Crematogaster queenslandica Forel, 1902 – Little valentine ant
- Crematogaster rufotestacea Mayr, 1876
- Crematogaster scita Forel, 1902
- Crematogaster whitei Wheeler, 1915
- Crematogaster xerophila Wheeler, 1915

== Cryptopone ==
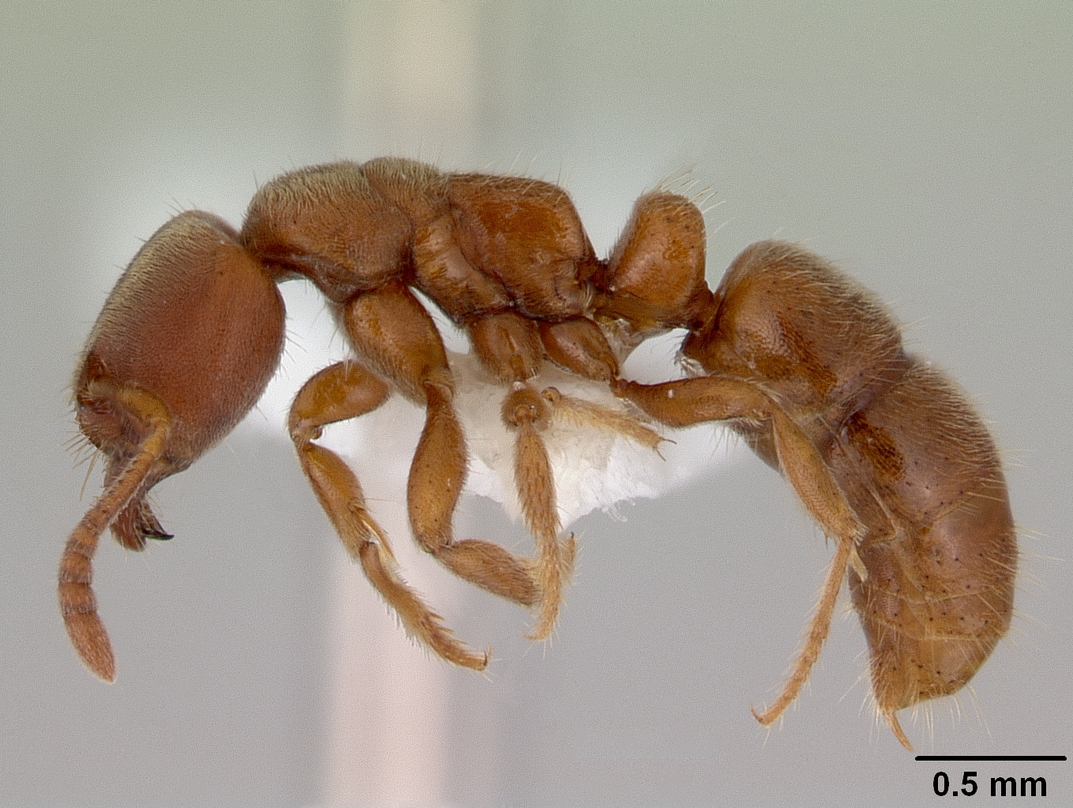
Cryptopone rotundiceps

- Cryptopone rotundiceps (Emery, 1914)

== Diacamma ==
References:

- Diacamma australe (Fabricius, 1775) – Australian bladder ant
- Diacamma colosseense Forel, 1915
- Diacamma leve Crawley, 1915
- Diacamma schoedli Shattuck & Barnett, 2006

== Dilobocondyla ==
- Dilobocondyla cataulacoidea (Stitz, 1911)

== Discothyrea ==
References:

- Discothyrea bidens Clark, 1928
- Discothyrea crassicornis Clark, 1926
- Discothyrea leae Clark, 1934
- Discothyrea turtoni Clark, 1934
- Discothyrea velutina (Wheeler, 1916)

== Doleromyrma ==
References:

- Doleromyrma darwiniana (Forel, 1907) – Brown house ant
- Doleromyrma rottnestensis Wheeler, 1934

== Dolichoderus ==
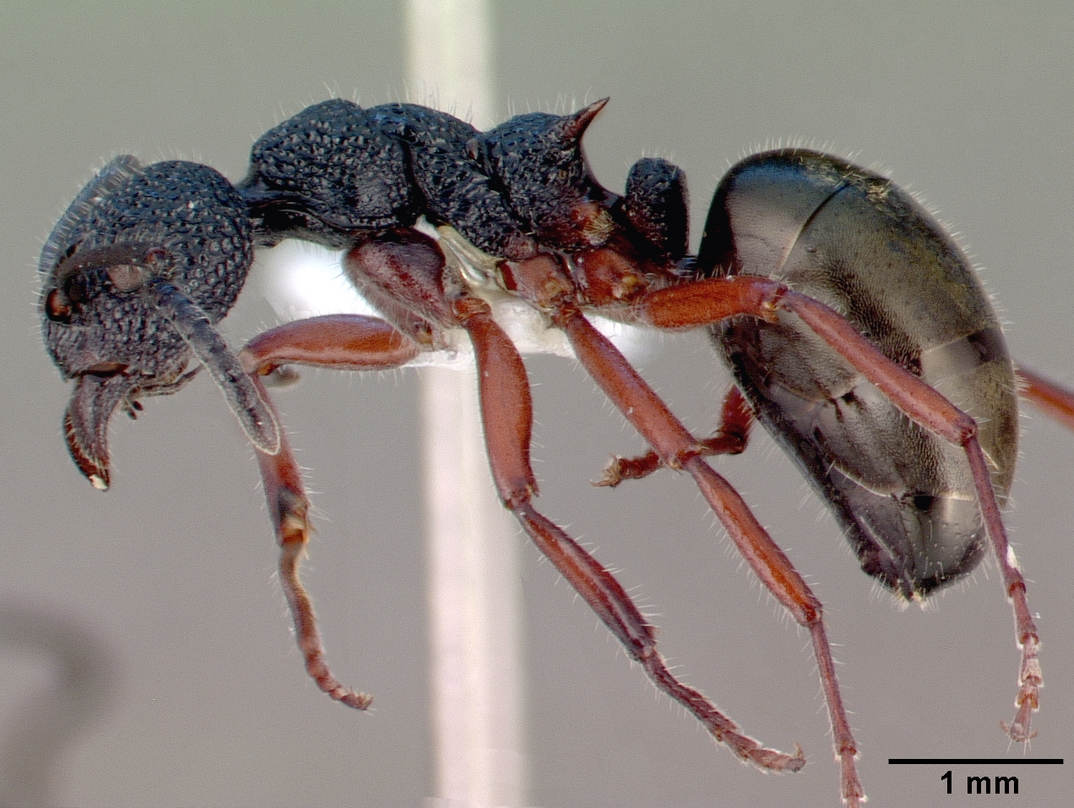
Dolichoderus scabridus

References:

- Dolichoderus albamaculus Shattuck & Marsden, 2013
- Dolichoderus angusticornis Clark, 1930
- Dolichoderus australis André, 1896 – Soft dolly ant
- Dolichoderus canopus Shattuck & Marsden, 2013
- Dolichoderus clarki Wheeler, 1935
- Dolichoderus clusor Forel, 1907
- Dolichoderus dentatus Forel, 1902
- Dolichoderus doriae Emery, 1887 – Double spined dolly ant
- Dolichoderus etus Shattuck & Marsden, 2013
- Dolichoderus extensispinus Forel, 1915
- Dolichoderus formosus Clark, 1930
- Dolichoderus gordoni Shattuck & Marsden, 2013
- Dolichoderus goudiei Clark, 1930
- Dolichoderus inferus Shattuck & Marsden, 2013
- Dolichoderus kathae Shattuck & Marsden, 2013
- Dolichoderus niger Crawley, 1922
- Dolichoderus nigricornis Clark, 1930
- Dolichoderus omicron Shattuck & Marsden, 2013
- Dolichoderus parvus Clark, 1930
- Dolichoderus reflexus Clark, 1930 – Sharkfined dolly ant
- Dolichoderus rufotibialis Clark, 1930
- Dolichoderus rutilus Shattuck & Marsden, 2013
- Dolichoderus scabridus Roger, 1862
- Dolichoderus scrobiculatus (Mayr, 1876) – Northern sharkfined dolly ant
- Dolichoderus semiorbis Shattuck & Marsden, 2013
- Dolichoderus turneri Forel, 1902
- Dolichoderus ypsilon Forel, 1902

== Echinopla ==
References:

- Echinopla australis Forel, 1901
- Echinopla turneri Forel, 1901

== Ectomomyrmex ==
- Ectomomyrmex astutus Smith, 1858
- Ectomomyrmex ruficornis (Clark, 1934)

== Epopostruma ==
References:

- Epopostruma angela Shattuck, 2000
- Epopostruma angulata Shattuck, 2000
- Epopostruma areosylva Shattuck, 2000
- Epopostruma avicula Shattuck, 2000
- Epopostruma curiosa Shattuck, 2000
- Epopostruma frosti (Brown, 1948)
- Epopostruma infuscocephala Shattuck, 2000
- Epopostruma inornata Shattuck, 2007
- Epopostruma kangarooensis Shattuck, 2000
- Epopostruma lattini Shattuck, 2000
- Epopostruma mercurii Shattuck, 2000
- Epopostruma monstrosa Viehmeyer, 1925
- Epopostruma natalae Shattuck, 2000
- Epopostruma quadrispinosa (Forel, 1895)
- Epopostruma sowestensis Shattuck, 2000
- Epopostruma terrula Shattuck, 2000
- Epopostruma vitta Shattuck, 2000
- Epopostruma wardi Shattuck, 2000

== Eurhopalothrix ==
- Eurhopalothrix australis Brown & Kempf, 1960
- Eurhopalothrix emeryi (Forel, 1912)
- Eurhopalothrix procera (Emery, 1897)

== Froggattella ==
- Froggattella kirbii (Lowne, 1865) – Common froglet ant
- Froggattella latispina Wheeler, 1936

== Gnamptogenys ==
- Gnamptogenys biroi (Emery, 1902)

== Heteroponera ==
- Heteroponera crozieri Taylor, 2011
- Heteroponera darlingtonorum Taylor, 2015
- Heteroponera ecarinata Taylor, 2015
- Heteroponera imbellis (Emery, 1895)
- Heteroponera leae (Wheeler, 1923)
- Heteroponera lioprocta Taylor, 2015
- Heteroponera majeri Taylor, 2011
- Heteroponera monteithi Taylor, 2015
- Heteroponera pendergrasti Taylor, 2015
- Heteroponera relicta (Wheeler, 1915)
- Heteroponera rhodopygea Taylor, 2015
- Heteroponera trachypyx Taylor, 2015
- Heteroponera viviennae Taylor, 2015
- Heteroponera wilsoni Taylor, 2015

== Hypoponera ==
References:

- Hypoponera congrua (Wheeler, 1934)
- Hypoponera convexiuscula (Forel, 1900)
- Hypoponera decora (Clark, 1934)
- Hypoponera elliptica (Forel, 1900)
- Hypoponera herbertonensis (Forel, 1915)
- Hypoponera mackayensis (Forel, 1900)
- Hypoponera punctatissima (Roger, 1859)
- Hypoponera queenslandensis (Forel, 1900)
- Hypoponera rectidens (Clark, 1934)
- Hypoponera scitula (Clark, 1934)
- Hypoponera sulciceps (Clark, 1928)

== Iridomyrmex ==
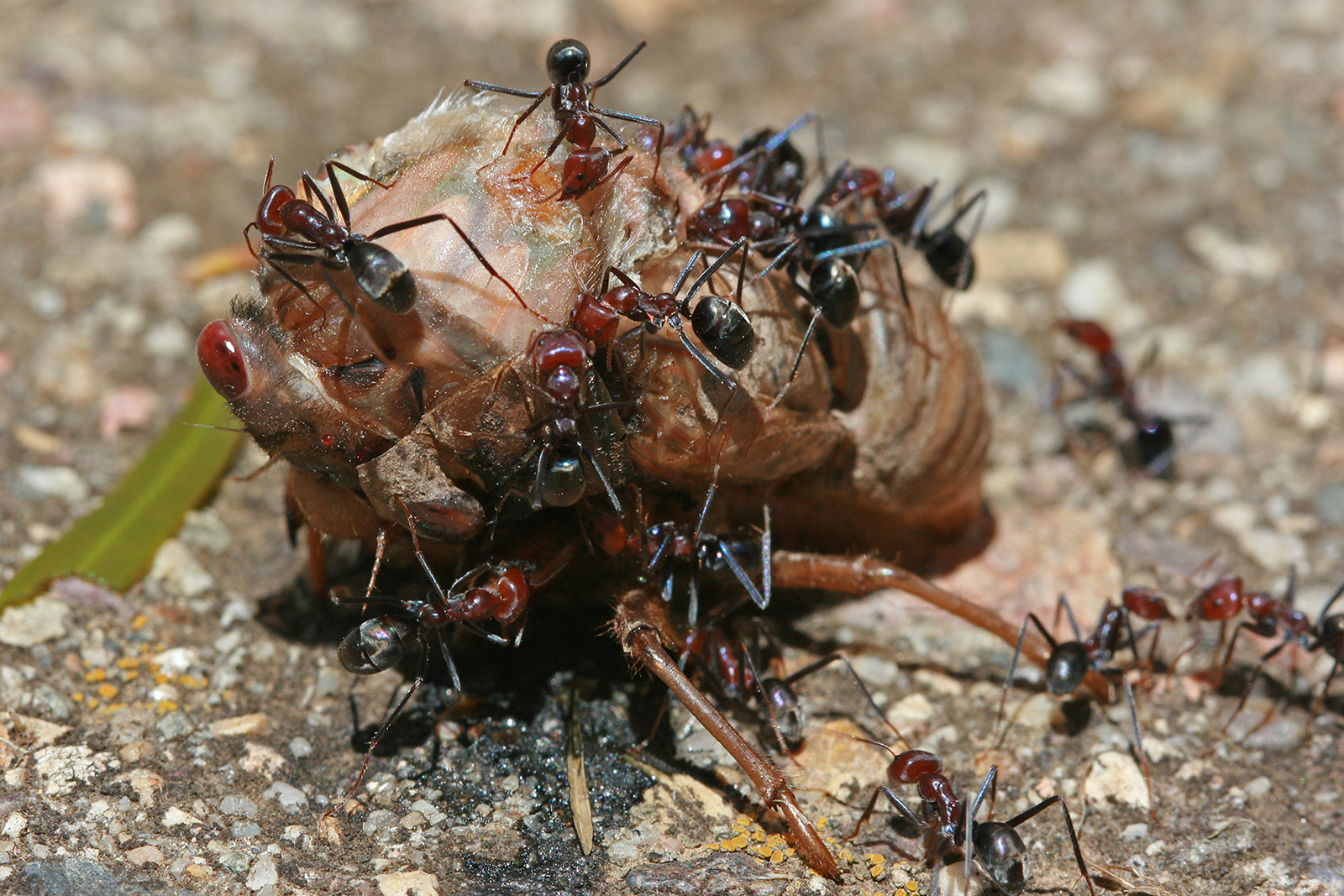
Iridomyrmex purpureus

- Iridomyrmex adstringatus Heterick & Shattuck, 2011
- Iridomyrmex agilis Forel, 1907 – Agile tyrant ant
- Iridomyrmex alpinus Heterick & Shattuck, 2011
- Iridomyrmex anceps (Roger, 1863) – Tropical tyrant ant
- Iridomyrmex anderseni Shattuck, 1993
- Iridomyrmex angusticeps Forel, 1901
- Iridomyrmex anteroinclinus Shattuck, 1993
- Iridomyrmex atypicus Heterick & Shattuck, 2011
- Iridomyrmex azureus Viehmeyer, 1914
- Iridomyrmex bicknelli Emery, 1898 – Dome headed tyrant ant
- Iridomyrmex bigi Shattuck, 1993
- Iridomyrmex brennani Heterick & Shattuck, 2011
- Iridomyrmex brunneus Forel, 1902
- Iridomyrmex calvus Emery, 1914
- Iridomyrmex cappoinclinus Shattuck, 1993
- Iridomyrmex cephaloinclinus Shattuck, 1993
- Iridomyrmex chasei Forel, 1902
- Iridomyrmex coeruleus Heterick & Shattuck, 2011
- Iridomyrmex conifer Forel, 1902 – Coned tyrant ant
- Iridomyrmex continentis Forel, 1907
- Iridomyrmex cuneiceps Heterick & Shattuck, 2011
- Iridomyrmex cupreus Heterick & Shattuck, 2011
- Iridomyrmex curvifrons Heterick & Shattuck, 2011
- Iridomyrmex cyaneus Wheeler, 1915 – Blue tyrant ant
- Iridomyrmex difficilis Heterick & Shattuck, 2011
- Iridomyrmex discors Forel, 1902
- Iridomyrmex dromus Clark, 1938
- Iridomyrmex elongatus Heterick & Shattuck, 2011
- Iridomyrmex exsanguis Forel, 1907
- Iridomyrmex fulgens Heterick & Shattuck, 2011
- Iridomyrmex galbanus Shattuck, 1993
- Iridomyrmex gibbus Heterick & Shattuck, 2011
- Iridomyrmex gumnos Heterick & Shattuck, 2011
- Iridomyrmex hartmeyeri Forel, 1907
- Iridomyrmex hertogi Heterick & Shattuck, 2011
- Iridomyrmex hesperus Shattuck, 1993
- Iridomyrmex infuscus Heterick & Shattuck, 2011
- Iridomyrmex innocens Forel, 1907
- Iridomyrmex lividus Shattuck, 1993 – Blue meat ant
- Iridomyrmex longisoma Heterick & Shattuck, 2011
- Iridomyrmex luteoclypeatus Heterick & Shattuck, 2011
- Iridomyrmex macrops Heterick & Shattuck, 2011
- Iridomyrmex mattiroloi Emery, 1898 – Little tyrant ant
- Iridomyrmex mayri Forel, 1915 – Titan pony ant
- Iridomyrmex meridianus Heterick & Shattuck, 2011
- Iridomyrmex minor Forel, 1915
- Iridomyrmex mirabilis Heterick & Shattuck, 2011
- Iridomyrmex mjobergi Forel, 1915
- Iridomyrmex neocaledonica Heterick & Shattuck, 2011
- Iridomyrmex niger Heterick & Shattuck, 2011
- Iridomyrmex nudipes Heterick & Shattuck, 2011
- Iridomyrmex obscurior Forel, 1902
- Iridomyrmex obsidianus Emery, 1914
- Iridomyrmex omalonotus Heterick & Shattuck, 2011
- Iridomyrmex pallidus Forel, 1901
- Iridomyrmex phillipensis Heterick & Shattuck, 2011
- Iridomyrmex prismatis Shattuck, 1993
- Iridomyrmex purpureus (Smith, 1858) – Meat ant
- Iridomyrmex reburrus Shattuck, 1993 – Bearded meat ant
- Iridomyrmex roseatus Heterick & Shattuck, 2011
- Iridomyrmex rubriceps Forel, 1902
- Iridomyrmex rufoinclinus Shattuck, 1993 – Northern bearded tyrant ant
- Iridomyrmex rufoniger (Lowne, 1865) – Tufted tyrant ant
- Iridomyrmex sanguineus Forel, 1910 – Northern meat ant
- Iridomyrmex setoconus Shattuck & McMillan, 1998
- Iridomyrmex spadius Shattuck, 1993
- Iridomyrmex splendens Forel, 1907
- Iridomyrmex spodipilus Shattuck, 1993
- Iridomyrmex spurcus Wheeler, 1915
- Iridomyrmex suchieri Forel, 1907
- Iridomyrmex suchieroides Heterick & Shattuck, 2011
- Iridomyrmex tenebrans Heterick & Shattuck, 2011
- Iridomyrmex tenuiceps Heterick & Shattuck, 2011
- Iridomyrmex trigonoceps Heterick & Shattuck, 2011
- Iridomyrmex turbineus Shattuck & McMillan, 1998
- Iridomyrmex victorianus Forel, 1902
- Iridomyrmex viridiaeneus Viehmeyer, 1914 – Centralian meat ant
- Iridomyrmex viridigaster Clark, 1941 – Southern bearded tyrant ant
- Iridomyrmex xanthocoxa Heterick & Shattuck, 2011

== Iroponera ==
References:

- Iroponera odax Schmidt & Shattuck, 2014

== Leptanilla ==
- Leptanilla swani Wheeler, 1932

== Leptogenys ==
References:

- Leptogenys adlerzi Forel, 1900
- Leptogenys angustinoda Clark, 1934
- Leptogenys anitae Forel, 1915
- Leptogenys bidentata Forel, 1900
- Leptogenys centralis Wheeler, 1915
- Leptogenys chelifera (Santschi, 1928)
- Leptogenys clarki Wheeler, 1933
- Leptogenys conigera (Mayr, 1876)
- Leptogenys darlingtoni Wheeler, 1933
- Leptogenys diminuta (Smith, 1857)
- Leptogenys ebenina Forel, 1915
- Leptogenys excisa (Mayr, 1876)
- Leptogenys exigua Crawley, 1921 – Genial killer ant
- Leptogenys fallax (Mayr, 1876)
- Leptogenys fortior Forel, 1900
- Leptogenys hackeri Clark, 1934
- Leptogenys intricata Viehmeyer, 1924
- Leptogenys longensis Forel, 1915
- Leptogenys magna Forel, 1900
- Leptogenys mjobergi Forel, 1915
- Leptogenys neutralis Forel, 1907
- Leptogenys podenzanai Emery, 1895
- Leptogenys sjostedti Forel, 1915
- Leptogenys tricosa Taylor, 1969
- Leptogenys turneri Forel, 1900

== Leptomyrmex ==
References:

- Leptomyrmex aitchisoni Smith and Shattuck, 2009
- Leptomyrmex burwelli Smith and Shattuck, 2009
- Leptomyrmex cnemidatus Wheeler, 1915
- Leptomyrmex darlingtoni Wheeler, 1934
- Leptomyrmex dolichoscapus Smith and Shattuck, 2009
- Leptomyrmex erythrocephalus (Fabricius, 1775) – Red-headed spider ant
- Leptomyrmex garretti Smith and Shattuck, 2009
- Leptomyrmex mjobergi Forel, 1915
- Leptomyrmex nigriventris (Guérin-Méneville, 1831)
- Leptomyrmex pilosus Smith and Shattuck, 2009
- Leptomyrmex ramorniensis Smith and Shattuck, 2009
- Leptomyrmex rothneyi Forel, 1902
- Leptomyrmex ruficeps Emery, 1895
- Leptomyrmex rufipes Emery, 1895
- Leptomyrmex rufithorax Forel, 1915
- Leptomyrmex tibialis Emery, 1895
- Leptomyrmex unicolor Emery, 1895
- Leptomyrmex varians Emery, 1895
- Leptomyrmex wiburdi Wheeler, 1915

== Linepithema ==
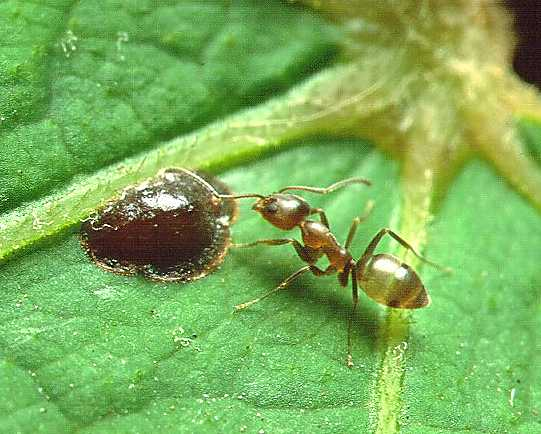
Linepithema humile

- Linepithema humile (Mayr, 1868) – introduced species – Argentine ant

== Lioponera ==
References:

- Lioponera aberrans (Clark, 1934)
- Lioponera adama Forel, 1910
- Lioponera angustata (Clark, 1924)
- Lioponera bicolor (Clark, 1924)
- Lioponera binodis Forel, 1910
- Lioponera brevicollis (Clark, 1923)
- Lioponera brevis (Clark, 1924) – Little cannibal ant
- Lioponera clarki (Crawley, 1922) – Speckled cannibal ant
- Lioponera clarus (Clark, 1930)
- Lioponera constricta (Clark, 1923)
- Lioponera crassa (Clark, 1941)
- Lioponera elegans (Wheeler, 1918)
- Lioponera emeryi Bolton, 1995
- Lioponera fervida (Wheeler, 1918) – Two lined cannibal ant
- Lioponera ficosa (Wheeler, 1918)
- Lioponera flammea (Clark, 1930)
- Lioponera gilesi (Clark, 1923)
- Lioponera grandis (Clark, 1934)
- Lioponera greavesi (Clark, 1934)
- Lioponera gwynethae (Clark, 1941)
- Lioponera heros (Wheeler, 1918)
- Lioponera inconspicua Brown, 1975
- Lioponera jovis Forel, 1915
- Lioponera larvata (Wheeler, 1918)
- Lioponera longitarsus (Mayr, 1878) – Topless cannibal ants
- Lioponera macrops (Clark, 1941)
- Lioponera mjobergi Forel, 1915
- Lioponera mullewana (Wheeler, 1918)
- Lioponera nigriventris (Clark, 1924)
- Lioponera picipes (Clark, 1924)
- Lioponera picta (Clark, 1934)
- Lioponera piliventris (Clark, 1941)
- Lioponera potteri (Clark, 1941)
- Lioponera punctatissima (Clark, 1923)
- Lioponera reticulata Brown, 1975
- Lioponera ruficornis (Clark, 1923)
- Lioponera rugulinodis (Wheeler, 1918)
- Lioponera senescens (Wheeler, 1918)
- Lioponera simmonsae (Clark, 1923)
- Lioponera singularis Forel, 1900 – Carinate cannibal ant
- Lioponera sjostedti Forel, 1915
- Lioponera turneri Forel, 1902
- Lioponera varians (Clark, 1924)

== Lordomyrma ==
- Lordomyrma leae Wheeler, 1919
- Lordomyrma punctiventris Wheeler, 1919

== Mayriella ==
References:

- Mayriella abstinens Forel, 1902
- Mayriella ebbei Shattuck & Barnett, 2007
- Mayriella occidua Shattuck, 2007
- Mayriella overbecki Viehmeyer, 1925
- Mayriella spinosior Wheeler, 1935

== Melophorus ==
References:

- Melophorus aeneovirens (Lowne, 1865) – Giant beaked furnace ant
- Melophorus anderseni Agosti, 1997 – Northern robber furnace ant
- Melophorus bagoti Lubbock, 1883 – Bagot's furnace ant
- Melophorus biroi Forel, 1907
- Melophorus bruneus McAreavey, 1949 – Brown furnace ants
- Melophorus constans Santschi, 1928
- Melophorus curtus Forel, 1902
- Melophorus fieldi Forel, 1910 – Common furnace ant
- Melophorus fulvihirtus Clark, 1941 – Southern robber furnace ant
- Melophorus hirsutus Forel, 1902 – Barrel furnace ant
- Melophorus insularis Wheeler, 1934
- Melophorus iridescens (Emery, 1887) – Racing furnace ant
- Melophorus laticeps Wheeler, 1915
- Melophorus ludius Forel, 1902
- Melophorus majeri Agosti, 1997
- Melophorus marius Forel, 1910
- Melophorus mjobergi Forel, 1915 – Pygmy furnace ant
- Melophorus omniparens Forel, 1915
- Melophorus pillipes Santschi, 1919 – Bottlebrush furnace ant
- Melophorus potteri McAreavey, 1947 – Bulldozer furnace ant
- Melophorus scipio Forel, 1915
- Melophorus turneri Forel, 1910
- Melophorus wheeleri Forel, 1910 – Harvester furnace ant

== Meranoplus ==
- Meranoplus ajax Forel, 1915
- Meranoplus angustinodis Schödl, 2007
- Meranoplus arcuatus Schödl, 2007
- Meranoplus aureolus Crawley, 1921
- Meranoplus barretti Santschi, 1928
- Meranoplus beatoni Taylor, 2006
- Meranoplus berrimah Schödl, 2007
- Meranoplus christinae Schödl, 2007
- Meranoplus convexius Schödl, 2007
- Meranoplus crassispina Schödl, 2007
- Meranoplus curvispina Forel, 1910
- Meranoplus deserticola Schödl, 2007
- Meranoplus dichrous Forel, 1907
- Meranoplus digitatus Schödl, 2007
- Meranoplus dimidiatus Smith, 1867 – Box shield ants
- Meranoplus discalis Schödl, 2007
- Meranoplus diversoides Schödl, 2007
- Meranoplus diversus Smith, 1867 – Harvester shield ant
- Meranoplus doddi Santschi, 1928
- Meranoplus duyfkeni Forel, 1915
- Meranoplus excavatus Clark, 1938
- Meranoplus fenestratus Smith, 1867 – Holy shield ant
- Meranoplus ferrugineus Crawley, 1922
- Meranoplus froggatti Forel, 1913 – False tirtle ant
- Meranoplus hilli Crawley, 1922
- Meranoplus hirsutus Mayr, 1876 – Jungle shield ant
- Meranoplus hoplites Taylor, 2006
- Meranoplus hospes Forel, 1910
- Meranoplus linae Santschi, 1928
- Meranoplus mars Forel, 1902
- Meranoplus mcarthuri Schödl, 2007
- Meranoplus minimus Crawley, 1922
- Meranoplus minor Forel, 1902
- Meranoplus mjobergi Forel, 1915 – Chocolate shield ant
- Meranoplus naitsabes Schödl, 2007
- Meranoplus occidentalis Schödl, 2007
- Meranoplus oceanicus Smith, 1862
- Meranoplus orientalis Schödl, 2007
- Meranoplus oxleyi Forel, 1915
- Meranoplus pubescens (Smith, 1853)
- Meranoplus puryi Forel, 1902
- Meranoplus rugosus Crawley, 1922
- Meranoplus schoedli Taylor, 2006
- Meranoplus similis Viehmeyer, 1922
- Meranoplus snellingi Schödl, 2007
- Meranoplus taurus Schödl, 2007
- Meranoplus testudineus McAreavey, 1956 – Turtle ant
- Meranoplus tricuspidatus Schödl, 2007
- Meranoplus unicolor Forel, 1902
- Meranoplus variabilis Schödl, 2007
- Meranoplus wilsoni Schödl, 2007

== Mesoponera ==
References:

- Mesoponera australis (Forel, 1900)
- Mesoponera rubra (Smith, F. 1857)

== Mesostruma ==
References:

- Mesostruma bella Shattuck, 2000
- Mesostruma browni Taylor, 1962
- Mesostruma eccentrica Taylor, 1973
- Mesostruma exolympica Taylor, 1973
- Mesostruma inornata Shattuck, 2000
- Mesostruma laevigata Brown, 1952
- Mesostruma loweryi Taylor, 1973
- Mesostruma spinosa Shattuck, 2007
- Mesostruma turneri (Forel, 1895)

== Metapone ==
- Metapone hoelldobleri Taylor & Alpert, 2016
- Metapone leae Wheeler, 1919
- Metapone mathinnae Taylor & Alpert, 2016
- Metapone mjobergi Forel, 1915
- Metapone tecklini Taylor & Alpert, 2016
- Metapone tillyardi Wheeler, 1919
- Metapone tricolor McAreavey, 1949

== Monomorium ==
- Monomorium aithoderum Heterick, 2001
- Monomorium albipes Heterick, 2001
- Monomorium anderseni Heterick, 2001
- Monomorium anthracinum Heterick, 2001
- Monomorium arenarium Heterick, 2001
- Monomorium bicorne Forel, 1907
- Monomorium bifidum Heterick, 2001 – Northern fanged mono ant
- Monomorium bihamatum Heterick, 2001
- Monomorium bogischi Wheeler, 1917
- Monomorium brachythrix Heterick, 2001
- Monomorium broschorum Sparks, 2015
- Monomorium burchera Heterick, 2001
- Monomorium capito Heterick, 2001
- Monomorium capeyork Sparks, 2015
- Monomorium carinatum Heterick, 2001 – Angled mono ant
- Monomorium castaneum Heterick, 2001
- Monomorium centrale Forel, 1910
- Monomorium crinitum Heterick, 2001
- Monomorium decuria Heterick, 2001
- Monomorium disetigerum Heterick, 2001
- Monomorium draculai Heterick, 2001
- Monomorium durokoppinense Heterick, 2001
- Monomorium elegantulum Heterick, 2001
- Monomorium eremoides Sparks, 2015
- Monomorium eremophilum Heterick, 2001
- Monomorium eremum Sparks, 2015
- Monomorium euryodon Heterick, 2001
- Monomorium falcatum (McAreavey, 1949)
- Monomorium fieldi Forel, 1910 – Little black mono ant
- Monomorium flavonigrum Heterick, 2001
- Monomorium floricola (Jerdon, 1851) (Note: Introduced species to Australia that is restricted to the country's northern regions.) – Brownish-red flower ant
- Monomorium geminum Sparks, 2015
- Monomorium gilberti Forel, 1902
- Monomorium hertogi Sparks, 2015
- Monomorium hoffmanni Sparks, 2015
- Monomorium humilior Forel, 1910
- Monomorium insolescens Wheeler, 1934 – Monsoonal mono ant
- Monomorium intrudens Smith, 1874
- Monomorium kidman Sparks, 2015
- Monomorium kiliani Forel, 1902
- Monomorium lacunosum Heterick, 2001
- Monomorium laeve Mayr, 1876 – Yellow mono ant
- Monomorium leae Forel, 1913
- Monomorium leda Forel, 1915
- Monomorium legulum Heterick, 2001
- Monomorium longiceps Wheeler, 1934 – Mallee mono ant
- Monomorium longinode Heterick, 2001
- Monomorium macarthuri Heterick, 2001
- Monomorium majeri Heterick, 2001
- Monomorium maryannae Sparks, 2015
- Monomorium megalops Heterick, 2001
- Monomorium merepah Sparks, 2015
- Monomorium micula Heterick, 2001
- Monomorium mitchell Sparks, 2015
- Monomorium nanum Heterick, 2001
- Monomorium nightcapense Heterick, 2001
- Monomorium nigriceps Heterick, 2001 – Little black mono ant
- Monomorium occidaneum Crawley, 1922
- Monomorium oodnadatta Sparks, 2015
- Monomorium parantarcticum Heterick, 2001
- Monomorium petiolatum Heterick, 2001
- Monomorium pharaonis (Linnaeus, 1758) (Note: Introduced species to Australia which has a global invasive distribution, originally from West Africa.) – Pharaoh ant
- Monomorium pilbara Sparks, 2015
- Monomorium pubescens Heterick, 2001
- Monomorium punctulatum Heterick, 2003
- Monomorium ravenshoense Heterick, 2001
- Monomorium rothsteini Forel, 1902 – Smiling mono ant
- Monomorium rubriceps Mayr, 1876
- Monomorium rufonigrum Heterick, 2001
- Monomorium sculpturatum Clark, 1934
- Monomorium shattucki Heterick, 2001
- Monomorium silaceum Heterick, 2001
- Monomorium sordidum Forel, 1902
- Monomorium speculum Sparks, 2015
- Monomorium stagnum Sparks, 2015
- Monomorium stictonotum Heterick, 2001
- Monomorium striatifrons Heterick, 2001
- Monomorium subapterum Wheeler, 1917
- Monomorium sublamellatum Heterick, 2003
- Monomorium sydneyense Forel, 1902 – Sydney mono ant
- Monomorium tambourinense Forel, 1915 – Tambourine Mountain mono ant
- Monomorium tenebrosum Sparks, 2015
- Monomorium topend Sparks, 2015
- Monomorium torrens Sparks, 2015
- Monomorium whitei Wheeler, 1915 – Southern fanged mono ant
- Monomorium xantheklemma Heterick, 2001

== Myopias ==
- Myopias chapmani Willey & Brown, 1983
- Myopias delta Willey & Brown, 1983
- Myopias densesticta Willey & Brown, 1983
- Myopias tasmaniensis Wheeler, 1923
- Myopias tenuis (Emery, 1900)

== Myopopone ==
- Myopopone castanea (Smith, 1860)

== Myrmecia ==
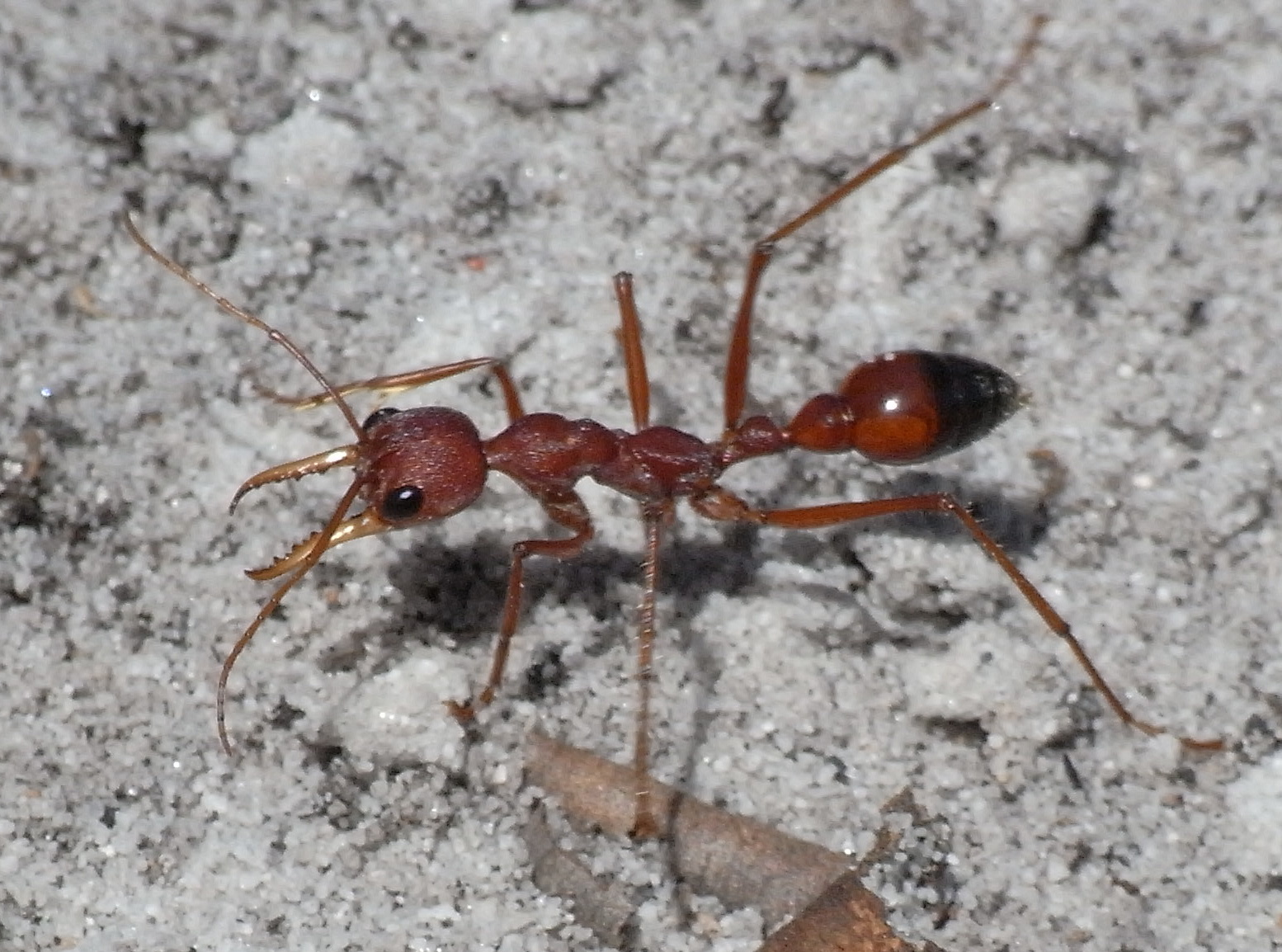
Myrmecia gulosa

- Myrmecia aberrans Forel, 1900 – Wide jawed bullant
- Myrmecia acuta Ogata & Taylor, 1991
- Myrmecia analis Mayr, 1862
- Myrmecia arnoldi Clark, 1951
- Myrmecia athertonensis Forel, 1915
- Myrmecia auriventris Mayr, 1870
- Myrmecia banksi Taylor, 2015
- Myrmecia borealis Ogata & Taylor, 1991
- Myrmecia brevinoda Forel, 1910 – Giant bull ant
- Myrmecia browningi Ogata & Taylor, 1991
- Myrmecia callima (Clark, 1943)
- Myrmecia cephalotes (Clark, 1943)
- Myrmecia chasei Forel, 1894
- Myrmecia chrysogaster (Clark, 1943) – Toothed bullant
- Myrmecia clarki Crawley, 1922
- Myrmecia comata Clark, 1951
- Myrmecia croslandi Taylor, 1991
- Myrmecia cydista (Clark, 1943)
- Myrmecia desertorum Wheeler, 1915
- Myrmecia dichospila Clark, 1938
- Myrmecia dimidiata Clark, 1951
- Myrmecia dispar (Clark, 1951)
- Myrmecia elegans (Clark, 1943)
- Myrmecia erecta Ogata & Taylor, 1991
- Myrmecia esuriens Fabricius, 1804 – Tasmanian Inchman
- Myrmecia eungellensis Ogata & Taylor, 1991
- Myrmecia exigua (Clark, 1943)
- Myrmecia fabricii Ogata & Taylor, 1991
- Myrmecia ferruginea Mayr, 1876
- Myrmecia flammicollis Brown, 1953
- Myrmecia flavicoma Roger, 1861
- Myrmecia forceps Roger, 1861
- Myrmecia forficata (Fabricius, 1787) – Inchmen ant
- Myrmecia formosa Wheeler, 1933
- Myrmecia froggatti Forel, 1910
- Myrmecia fucosa Clark, 1934
- Myrmecia fulgida Clark, 1951
- Myrmecia fulviculis Forel, 1913
- Myrmecia fulvipes Roger, 1861
- Myrmecia fuscipes Clark, 1951
- Myrmecia gilberti Forel, 1910
- Myrmecia gratiosa Clark, 1951
- Myrmecia gulosa (Fabricius, 1775) – Giant red bull ant
- Myrmecia harderi Forel, 1910
- Myrmecia haskinsorum Taylor, 2015
- Myrmecia hilli (Clark, 1943)
- Myrmecia hirsuta Clark, 1951
- Myrmecia imaii Taylor, 2015
- Myrmecia impaternata Taylor, 2015
- Myrmecia infima Forel, 1900
- Myrmecia inquilina Douglas & Brown, 1959
- Myrmecia loweryi Ogata & Taylor, 1991
- Myrmecia ludlowi Crawley, 1922
- Myrmecia luteiforceps Wheeler, 1933
- Myrmecia mandibularis Smith, 1858 – Toothless bullant
- Myrmecia maura Wheeler, 1933
- Myrmecia michaelseni Forel, 1907
- Myrmecia midas Clark, 1951
- Myrmecia minuscula Forel, 1915
- Myrmecia mjobergi Forel, 1915
- Myrmecia nigra Forel, 1907
- Myrmecia nigriceps Mayr, 1862 – Black-headed bull ant
- Myrmecia nigriscapa Roger, 1861
- Myrmecia nigrocincta Smith, 1858
- Myrmecia nobilis (Clark, 1943)
- Myrmecia occidentalis (Clark, 1943)
- Myrmecia pavida Clark, 1951
- Myrmecia petiolata Emery, 1895
- Myrmecia picta Smith, 1858
- Myrmecia picticeps Clark, 1951
- Myrmecia piliventris Smith, 1858 – Golden-tailed bull ant
- Myrmecia pilosula Smith, 1858 – Jack jumper ant
- Myrmecia potteri (Clark, 1951)
- Myrmecia pulchra Clark, 1929
- Myrmecia pyriformis Smith, 1858 – Inch ant
- Myrmecia queenslandica Forel, 1915
- Myrmecia regularis Crawley, 1925
- Myrmecia rowlandi Forel, 1910
- Myrmecia rubicunda (Clark, 1943)
- Myrmecia rubripes Clark, 1951
- Myrmecia rufinodis Smith, 1858
- Myrmecia rugosa Wheeler, 1933
- Myrmecia simillima Smith, 1858
- Myrmecia subfasciata Viehmeyer, 1924
- Myrmecia swalei Crawley, 1922
- Myrmecia tarsata Smith, 1858
- Myrmecia tepperi Emery, 1898 – Bucktoothed bullant
- Myrmecia testaceipes (Clark, 1943)
- Myrmecia tridentata Ogata & Taylor, 1991
- Myrmecia urens Lowne, 1865 – Baby bull ant
- Myrmecia varians Mayr, 1876
- Myrmecia vindex Smith, 1858

== Myrmecina ==
- Myrmecina alpina Shattuck, 2009
- Myrmecina australis Wheeler and Wheeler, 1973
- Myrmecina difficulta Shattuck, 2009
- Myrmecina eruga Shattuck, 2009
- Myrmecina inaequala Shattuck, 2009
- Myrmecina pumila Shattuck, 2009
- Myrmecina rugosa Forel, 1902
- Myrmecina silvalaeva Shattuck, 2009
- Myrmecina silvampla Shattuck, 2009
- Myrmecina silvangula Shattuck, 2009
- Myrmecina silvarugosa Shattuck, 2009
- Myrmecina silvatransversa Shattuck, 2009
- Myrmecina wesselensis Shattuck, 2009

== Myrmecorhynchus ==
- Myrmecorhynchus carteri Clark, 1934
- Myrmecorhynchus emeryi André, 1896
- Myrmecorhynchus musgravei Clark, 1934
- Myrmecorhynchus nitidus Clark, 1934
- Myrmecorhynchus rufithorax Clark, 1934

== Mystrium ==
- Mystrium camillae Emery, 1889

== Nebothriomyrmex ==
- Nebothriomyrmex majeri Dubovikoff, 2004

== Nothomyrmecia ==
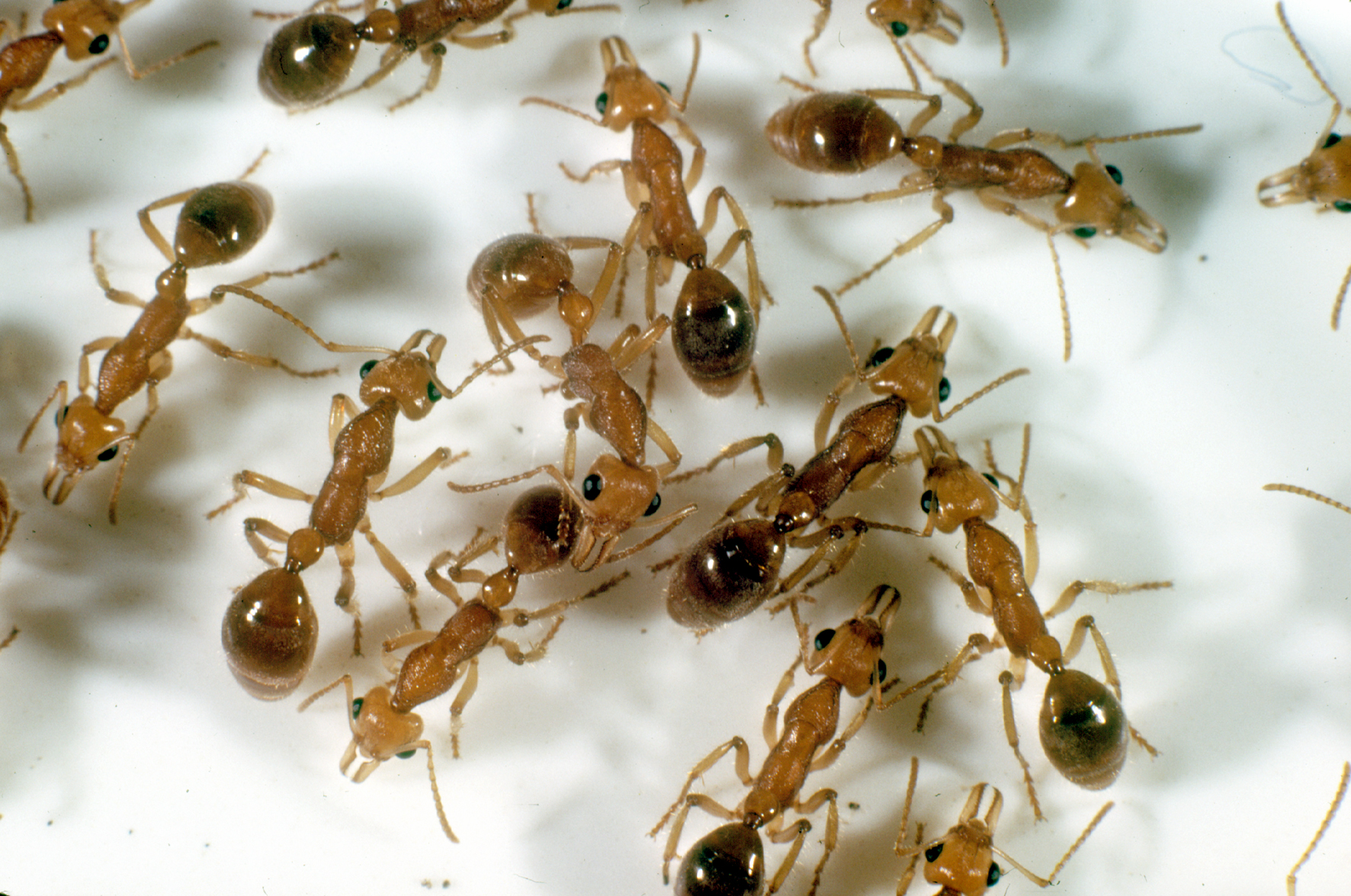
Nothomyrmecia macrops

- Nothomyrmecia macrops Clark, 1951 – Dinosaur ant

== Notoncus ==
References:

- Notoncus capitatus Forel, 1915
- Notoncus ectatommoides (Forel, 1892) – Pronged epaulet ant
- Notoncus enormis Szabó, 1910 – Bulbous epaulet ants
- Notoncus gilberti Forel, 1895 – Smooth epaulet ant
- Notoncus hickmani Clark, 1930 – Yellow epaulet ant
- Notoncus spinisquamis (André, 1896) – Giant epaulet ant

== Notostigma ==
- Notostigma carazzii (Emery, 1895)
- Notostigma foreli Emery, 1920

== Nylanderia ==
- Nylanderia bourbonica (Forel, 1886)
- Nylanderia braueri (Mayr, 1868)
- Nylanderia glabrior (Forel, 1902)
- Nylanderia obscura (Mayr, 1862) – Swamp parrot ant
- Nylanderia rosae (Forel, 1902)
- Nylanderia tasmaniensis (Forel, 1913)
- Nylanderia vaga (Forel, 1901) – Forest parrot ant

== Ochetellus ==
References:

- Ochetellus democles (Walker, 1839)
- Ochetellus flavipes (Kirby, 1896) – Spinifex ant
- Ochetellus glaber (Mayr, 1862) – Black house ant
- Ochetellus punctatissimus (Emery, 1887)

== Odontomachus ==
References:

- Odontomachus cephalotes Smith, 1863
- Odontomachus ruficeps Smith, 1858
- Odontomachus simillimus Smith, 1858
- Odontomachus turneri Forel, 1900 – Garden snappy ant

== Oecophylla ==
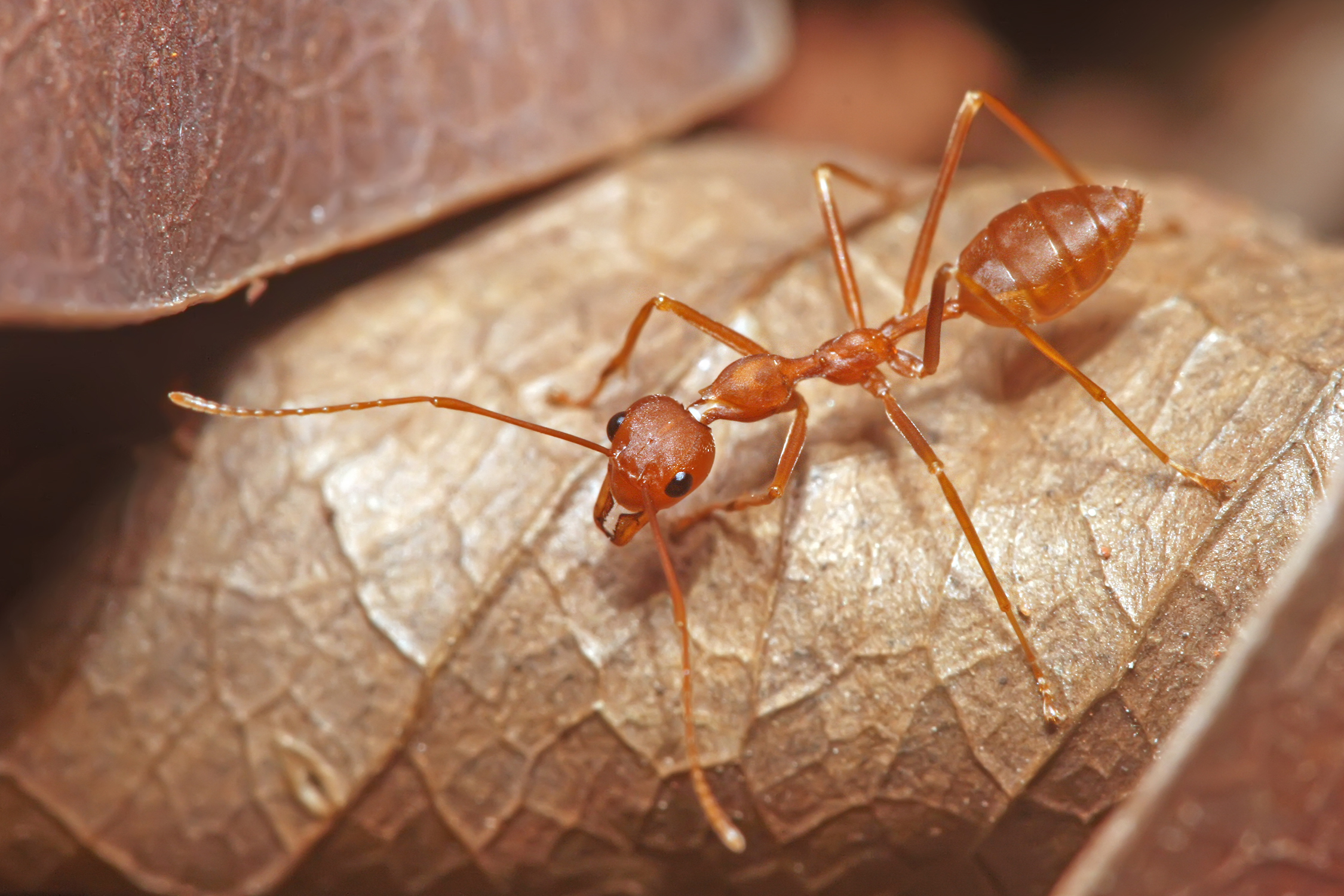
Oecophylla smaragdina

- Oecophylla smaragdina (Fabricius, 1775) – Green tree ant

== Onychomyrmex ==
- Onychomyrmex doddi Wheeler, 1916
- Onychomyrmex hedleyi Emery, 1895
- Onychomyrmex mjobergi Forel, 1915

== Ooceraea ==
- Ooceraea australis (Forel, 1900) – Blind cannibal ant

== Opisthopsis ==
- Opisthopsis diadematus Wheeler, 1918 – Black capped strobe ant
- Opisthopsis haddoni Emery, 1893 – Red-headed strobe ant
- Opisthopsis jocosus Wheeler, 1918
- Opisthopsis lienosus Wheeler, 1918
- Opisthopsis major Forel, 1902 – Tufted strobe ant
- Opisthopsis maurus Wheeler, 1918
- Opisthopsis pictus Emery, 1895 – Painted strobe ant
- Opisthopsis respiciens (Smith, 1865)
- Opisthopsis rufithorax Emery, 1895 – Black-headed strobe ant

== Orectognathus ==
- Orectognathus alligator Taylor, 1980
- Orectognathus antennatus Smith, 1854
- Orectognathus clarki Brown, 1953
- Orectognathus coccinatus Taylor, 1980
- Orectognathus darlingtoni Taylor, 1977
- Orectognathus elegantulus Taylor, 1977
- Orectognathus howensis Wheeler, 1927 – Lord Howe Island goblin ant
- Orectognathus kanangra Taylor, 1980
- Orectognathus mjobergi Forel, 1915
- Orectognathus nanus Taylor, 1977
- Orectognathus nigriventris Mercovich, 1958
- Orectognathus parvispinus Taylor, 1977
- Orectognathus phyllobates Brown, 1958
- Orectognathus robustus Taylor, 1977
- Orectognathus rostratus Lowery, 1967
- Orectognathus satan Brown, 1953
- Orectognathus sexspinosus Forel, 1915
- Orectognathus versicolor Donisthorpe, 1940

== Papyrius ==
References:

- Papyrius flavus (Mayr, 1865)
- Papyrius nitidus (Mayr, 1862) – Red cocktail ant

== Paraparatrechina ==
- Paraparatrechina minutula (Forel, 1901)
- Paraparatrechina nana (Santschi, 1928)

== Paratrechina ==
- Paratrechina longicornis (Latreille, 1802) – introduced species – Hairy ant

== Parvaponera ==
- Parvaponera darwinii (Forel, 1893)

== Peronomyrmex ==
- Peronomyrmex bartoni Shattuck & Hinkley, 2002
- Peronomyrmex greavesi Shattuck, 2006
- Peronomyrmex overbecki Viehmeyer, 1922

== Pheidole ==
References:

- Pheidole ampla Forel, 1893 – Seedharvesting ant
- Pheidole anthracina Forel, 1902 – Seedharvesting ant
- Pheidole antipodum (Smith, 1858)
- Pheidole athertonensis Forel, 1915
- Pheidole bos Forel, 1893
- Pheidole brevicornis Mayr, 1876
- Pheidole cairnsiana Forel, 1902
- Pheidole concentrica Forel, 1902
- Pheidole conficta Forel, 1902
- Pheidole deserticola Forel, 1910
- Pheidole dispar (Forel, 1895)
- Pheidole gellibrandi Clark, 1934
- Pheidole hartmeyeri Forel, 1907 – Harvester bigheaded ant
- Pheidole impressiceps Mayr, 1876 – Giant big-headed ant
- Pheidole incurvata Viehmeyer, 1924
- Pheidole liteae Forel, 1910
- Pheidole longiceps Mayr, 1876 – Knobbed bigheaded ant
- Pheidole megacephala (Fabricius, 1793) (Note: Introduced species to Australia that is a serious threat to native invertebrate fauna.) – Coastal brown ant
- Pheidole mjobergi Forel, 1915 – Savanna bigheaded ant
- Pheidole oceanica Mayr, 1866
- Pheidole opaciventris Mayr, 1876
- Pheidole platypus Crawley, 1915
- Pheidole proxima Mayr, 1876
- Pheidole pyriformis Clark, 1938
- Pheidole spinoda (Smith, 1858)
- Pheidole tasmaniensis Mayr, 1866
- Pheidole trapezoidea Viehmeyer, 1913
- Pheidole turneri Forel, 1902
- Pheidole variabilis Mayr, 1876
- Pheidole vigilans (Smith, 1858)
- Pheidole wiesei Forel, 1910

== Philidris ==
References:

- Philidris cordata (Smith, 1859)

== Plagiolepis ==
References:

- Plagiolepis clarki Wheeler, 1934
- Plagiolepis lucidula Wheeler, 1934
- Plagiolepis nynganensis McAreavey, 1949
- Plagiolepis squamulosa Wheeler, 1934
- Plagiolepis wilsoni (Clark, 1934)

== Platythyrea ==
- Platythyrea brunnipes (Clark, 1938)
- Platythyrea dentinodis (Clark, 1930)
- Platythyrea micans (Clark, 1930)
- Platythyrea parallela Smith, 1859 – Northern broadnosed killer ant
- Platythyrea turneri Forel, 1895 – Southern broadnosed killer ant

== Podomyrma ==
References:

- Podomyrma abdominalis Emery, 1887
- Podomyrma adelaidae (Smith, 1858) – Desert muscleman ant
- Podomyrma basalis Smith, 1859
- Podomyrma bispinosa Forel, 1901
- Podomyrma chasei Forel, 1901
- Podomyrma christae (Forel, 1907)
- Podomyrma clarki (Crawley, 1925)
- Podomyrma delbrueckii Forel, 1901
- Podomyrma densestrigosa Viehmeyer, 1924
- Podomyrma elongata Forel, 1895
- Podomyrma femorata Smith, 1859
- Podomyrma ferruginea (Clark, 1934)
- Podomyrma formosa (Smith, 1858)
- Podomyrma gastralis Emery, 1897
- Podomyrma gratiosa (Smith, 1858)
- Podomyrma grossestriata Forel, 1915
- Podomyrma inermis Mayr, 1876
- Podomyrma kitschneri (Forel, 1915)
- Podomyrma kraepelini Forel, 1901
- Podomyrma laevifrons Smith, 1859
- Podomyrma laevissima Smith, 1863
- Podomyrma lampros Viehmeyer, 1924
- Podomyrma libra (Forel, 1907)
- Podomyrma macrophthalma Viehmeyer, 1925
- Podomyrma maculiventris Emery, 1887
- Podomyrma marginata (McAreavey, 1949)
- Podomyrma micans Mayr, 1876
- Podomyrma mjobergi (Forel, 1915)
- Podomyrma muckeli Forel, 1910
- Podomyrma nitida (Clark, 1938)
- Podomyrma novemdentata Forel, 1901
- Podomyrma obscurior Forel, 1915
- Podomyrma octodentata Forel, 1901
- Podomyrma odae Forel, 1910
- Podomyrma omniparens (Forel, 1895)
- Podomyrma overbecki Viehmeyer, 1924
- Podomyrma rugosa (Clark, 1934)
- Podomyrma silvicola Smith, 1860
- Podomyrma turneri (Forel, 1901)

== Polyrhachis ==
- Polyrhachis abbreviata Kohout, 2006
- Polyrhachis alphea Smith, 1863
- Polyrhachis ammon (Fabricius, 1775)
- Polyrhachis ammonoeides Roger, 1863
- Polyrhachis anderseni Kohout, 2013
- Polyrhachis andromache Roger, 1863
- Polyrhachis angusta Forel, 1902
- Polyrhachis appendiculata Emery, 1893
- Polyrhachis archeri Kohout, 2013
- Polyrhachis arcuata (Le Guillou, 1841)
- Polyrhachis argenteosignata Emery, 1900
- Polyrhachis argentosa Forel, 1902
- Polyrhachis atropos Smith, 1860
- Polyrhachis aurea Mayr, 1876
- Polyrhachis aurora Kohout, 2013
- Polyrhachis australis Mayr, 1870
- Polyrhachis bamaga Kohout, 1990
- Polyrhachis barretti Clark, 1928
- Polyrhachis bedoti Forel, 1902
- Polyrhachis bellicosa Smith, 1859
- Polyrhachis bicolor Smith, 1858
- Polyrhachis bispinosa Kohout, 2013
- Polyrhachis bohemia Kohout, 2013
- Polyrhachis brevinoda Kohout, 2006
- Polyrhachis brisbanensis Kohout, 2013
- Polyrhachis brutella Kohout, 2013
- Polyrhachis burwelli Kohout, 2013
- Polyrhachis callima Kohout, 2013
- Polyrhachis capeyorkensis Kohout, 2013
- Polyrhachis capillata Kohout, 2013
- Polyrhachis captiva Kohout, 2013
- Polyrhachis cedarensis Forel, 1915
- Polyrhachis clarki Kohout, 2013
- Polyrhachis cleopatra Forel, 1902
- Polyrhachis clio Forel, 1902
- Polyrhachis clotho Forel, 1902
- Polyrhachis conciliata Kohout, 2013
- Polyrhachis consimilis Smith, 1858
- Polyrhachis constricta Emery, 1897
- Polyrhachis contemta Mayr, 1876
- Polyrhachis cracenta Kohout, 2013
- Polyrhachis crawleyi Forel, 1916
- Polyrhachis creusa Emery, 1897
- Polyrhachis cupreata Emery, 1895
- Polyrhachis curtospinosa Kohout, 2013
- Polyrhachis cydista Kohout, 2008
- Polyrhachis cyrus Forel, 1901
- Polyrhachis daemeli Mayr, 1876 – Daemel's Spiny Ant
- Polyrhachis darlingtoni Kohout, 2013
- Polyrhachis decumbens Kohout, 2006
- Polyrhachis delecta Kohout, 2006
- Polyrhachis delicata Crawley, 1915
- Polyrhachis denticulata Karavaiev, 1927
- Polyrhachis dispar Kohout, 2010
- Polyrhachis diversa Kohout, 2013
- Polyrhachis dives Smith, 1857
- Polyrhachis dorowi Kohout, 2009
- Polyrhachis dougcooki Kohout, 2013
- Polyrhachis electra Kohout, 2013
- Polyrhachis elegantula Kohout, 2013
- Polyrhachis erato Forel, 1902
- Polyrhachis eremita Kohout, 1990
- Polyrhachis eureka Kohout, 2013
- Polyrhachis euterpe Forel, 1902
- Polyrhachis expressa Kohout, 2006
- Polyrhachis feehani Kohout, 2013
- Polyrhachis femorata Smith, 1858 – Southern broad-nosed spiny ant
- Polyrhachis fervens Smith, 1860
- Polyrhachis flavibasis Clark, 1930 – Northern broad-nosed spiny ant
- Polyrhachis foreli Kohout, 1989
- Polyrhachis fuscipes Mayr, 1862
- Polyrhachis gab Forel, 1880
- Polyrhachis glabrinotum Clark, 1930
- Polyrhachis gravis Clark, 1930 – Gravis spiny ant
- Polyrhachis guerini Roger, 1863
- Polyrhachis heinlethii Forel, 1895
- Polyrhachis hermione Emery, 1895
- Polyrhachis hespera Kohout, 2013
- Polyrhachis hexacantha (Erichson, 1842)
- Polyrhachis hirsuta Mayr, 1876 – Hairy spiny ant
- Polyrhachis hoelldobleri Kohout, 2006
- Polyrhachis hoffmanni Kohout, 2013
- Polyrhachis hookeri Lowne, 1865
- Polyrhachis incerta Kohout, 2008
- Polyrhachis inconspicua Emery, 1887 – Little spiny ant
- Polyrhachis injinooi Kohout, 2013
- Polyrhachis insularis Emery, 1887
- Polyrhachis inusitata Kohout, 1989
- Polyrhachis io Forel, 1915
- Polyrhachis isolata Kohout, 2013
- Polyrhachis jacksoniana Roger, 1863
- Polyrhachis lachesis Forel, 1897
- Polyrhachis lata Emery, 1895
- Polyrhachis latreillii (Guérin, 1838)
- Polyrhachis leae Forel, 1913
- Polyrhachis levior Roger, 1863
- Polyrhachis loweryi Kohout, 1990
- Polyrhachis lownei Forel, 1895
- Polyrhachis lydiae Forel, 1902
- Polyrhachis machaon Santschi, 1920
- Polyrhachis mackayi Donisthorpe, 1938
- Polyrhachis macropa Wheeler, 1916 – Mulga spiny ant
- Polyrhachis maculata Forel, 1915
- Polyrhachis melanura Kohout, 2013
- Polyrhachis menozzii Karavaiev, 1927
- Polyrhachis micans Mayr, 1876 – Devil spiny ant
- Polyrhachis mjobergi Forel, 1915
- Polyrhachis monteithi Kohout, 2006
- Polyrhachis mucronata Smith, 1859
- Polyrhachis nourlangie Kohout, 2013
- Polyrhachis obscura Forel, 1895
- Polyrhachis obtusa Emery, 1897
- Polyrhachis opacita Kohout, 2013
- Polyrhachis ops Forel, 1907
- Polyrhachis ornata Mayr, 1876 – Golden spiny ant
- Polyrhachis pallescens Mayr, 1876
- Polyrhachis palmerae Kohout, 2013
- Polyrhachis patiens Santschi, 1920 – Toothed spiny ant
- Polyrhachis paxilla Smith, 1863
- Polyrhachis penelope Forel, 1895
- Polyrhachis phryne Forel, 1907
- Polyrhachis pilbara Kohout, 2013
- Polyrhachis pilosa Donisthorpe, 1938
- Polyrhachis placida Kohout, 2013
- Polyrhachis polymnia Forel, 1902
- Polyrhachis prometheus Santschi, 1920
- Polyrhachis pseudothrinax Hung, 1967 – Unicorn spiny ant
- Polyrhachis punctiventris Mayr, 1876
- Polyrhachis pyrrhus Forel, 1910
- Polyrhachis queenslandica Emery, 1895
- Polyrhachis reclinata Emery, 1887
- Polyrhachis robsoni Kohout, 2006
- Polyrhachis rowlandi Forel, 1910
- Polyrhachis rufifemur Forel, 1907
- Polyrhachis rufofemorata Smith, 1859
- Polyrhachis rustica Kohout, 1990
- Polyrhachis rutila Kohout, 2006
- Polyrhachis schenkii Forel, 1886
- Polyrhachis schoopae Forel, 1902
- Polyrhachis schwiedlandi Forel, 1902
- Polyrhachis seducta Kohout, 2013
- Polyrhachis semiaurata Mayr, 1876
- Polyrhachis semiobscura Donisthorpe, 1944
- Polyrhachis semipolita André, 1896
- Polyrhachis senilis Forel, 1902 – Savanna spiny ant
- Polyrhachis sexspinosa (Latreille, 1802)
- Polyrhachis shattucki Kohout, 2013
- Polyrhachis sidnica Mayr, 1866
- Polyrhachis smithersi Kohout, 2012
- Polyrhachis sokolova Forel, 1902
- Polyrhachis stricta Kohout, 2013
- Polyrhachis tambourinensis Forel, 1915
- Polyrhachis tanami Kohout, 2013
- Polyrhachis templi Forel, 1902
- Polyrhachis tenebra Kohout, 2013
- Polyrhachis terpsichore Forel, 1893
- Polyrhachis thais Forel, 1910
- Polyrhachis thusnelda Forel, 1902
- Polyrhachis trapezoidea Mayr, 1876
- Polyrhachis tubifera Forel, 1902
- Polyrhachis turneri Forel, 1895
- Polyrhachis uncaria Kohout, 2013
- Polyrhachis unicornis Kohout, 2013
- Polyrhachis vermiculosa Mayr, 1876
- Polyrhachis vernoni Kohout, 2013
- Polyrhachis weiri Kohout, 2013
- Polyrhachis yarrabahensis Forel, 1915
- Polyrhachis yorkana Forel, 1915
- Polyrhachis zimmerae Clark, 1941

== Ponera ==
- Ponera clavicornis Emery, 1900
- Ponera incerta Wheeler, 1933
- Ponera leae Forel, 1913 – Blind crypt ants
- Ponera selenophora Emery, 1900
- Ponera tenuis (Emery, 1900)

== Prionopelta ==
- Prionopelta robynmae Shattuck, 2008

== Pristomyrmex ==
- Pristomyrmex erythropygus Taylor, 1968
- Pristomyrmex foveolatus Taylor, 1965
- Pristomyrmex minusculus Wang, 2003
- Pristomyrmex quadridentatus (André, 1905)
- Pristomyrmex thoracicus Taylor, 1965
- Pristomyrmex wheeleri Taylor, 1965
- Pristomyrmex wilsoni Taylor, 1968

== Probolomyrmex ==
- Probolomyrmex aliundus Shattuck, Gunawardene & Heterick, 2012
- Probolomyrmex greavesi Taylor, 1965
- Probolomyrmex latalongus Shattuck, Gunawardene & Heterick, 2012

== Proceratium ==
- Proceratium australe de Andrade, 2003
- Proceratium cavinodus de Andrade, 2003
- Proceratium gigas de Andrade, 2003
- Proceratium gracile de Andrade, 2003
- Proceratium hirsutum de Andrade, 2003
- Proceratium pumilio de Andrade, 2003
- Proceratium robustum de Andrade, 2003
- Proceratium stictum Brown, 1958

== Prolasius ==
- Prolasius abruptus Clark, 1934
- Prolasius antennatus McAreavey, 1947
- Prolasius bruneus McAreavey, 1947 – Brown mistral ant
- Prolasius clarki McAreavey, 1947
- Prolasius convexus McAreavey, 1947
- Prolasius depressiceps (Emery, 1914)
- Prolasius flavicornis Clark, 1934
- Prolasius formicoides (Forel, 1902)
- Prolasius hellenae McAreavey, 1947
- Prolasius hemiflavus Clark, 1934
- Prolasius mjoebergella (Forel, 1916)
- Prolasius nitidissimus (André, 1896) – Black mistral ants
- Prolasius pallidus Clark, 1934 – Yellow mistral ant
- Prolasius quadratus McAreavey, 1947
- Prolasius reticulatus McAreavey, 1947
- Prolasius robustus McAreavey, 1947
- Prolasius wheeleri McAreavey, 1947
- Prolasius wilsoni McAreavey, 1947

== Pseudolasius ==
- Pseudolasius australis Forel, 1915

== Pseudoneoponera ==
References:

- Pseudoneoponera barbata Stitz, 1911
- Pseudoneoponera denticulata (Kirby, 1896)
- Pseudoneoponera dubitata (Forel, 1900)
- Pseudoneoponera excavata (Emery, 1893) – Eared foaming ant
- Pseudoneoponera mayri (Emery, 1887)
- Pseudoneoponera oculata (Smtih, 1858)
- Pseudoneoponera piliventris Smith, 1858
- Pseudoneoponera porcata (Emery, 1897) – Striped foaming ant
- Pseudoneoponera sublaevis (Emery, 1887) – Smooth foaming ant

== Pseudonotoncus ==
- Pseudonotoncus eurysikos Shattuck & O'Reilly, 2013
- Pseudonotoncus hirsutus Clark, 1934

== Pseudoponera ==
References:

- Pseudoponera pachynoda (Clark, 1930)
- Pseudoponera stigma (Fabricius, 1804) (Note: Introduced species to Australia that was first recorded in 1958.)

== Rhopalomastix ==
- Rhopalomastix rothneyi Forel, 1900

== Rhopalothrix ==
- Rhopalothrix orbis Taylor, 1968

== Rhytidoponera ==
- Rhytidoponera aciculata (Smith, 1858)
- Rhytidoponera anceps Emery, 1898
- Rhytidoponera araneoides (Le Guillou, 1841) – Spider pony ant
- Rhytidoponera aspera (Roger, 1860) – Rough blue pony ant
- Rhytidoponera aurata (Roger, 1861) – Lesser horned pony ant
- Rhytidoponera barnardi Clark, 1936
- Rhytidoponera barretti Clark, 1941
- Rhytidoponera borealis Crawley, 1918
- Rhytidoponera carinata Clark, 1936
- Rhytidoponera cerastes Crawley, 1925
- Rhytidoponera chalybaea Emery, 1901 – Blue pony ant
- Rhytidoponera chnoopyx Brown, 1958
- Rhytidoponera clarki Donisthorpe, 1943
- Rhytidoponera confusa Ward, 1980
- Rhytidoponera convexa (Mayr, 1876) – Convex pony ant
- Rhytidoponera cornuta (Emery, 1895)
- Rhytidoponera crassinoda (Forel, 1907)
- Rhytidoponera cristata (Mayr, 1876)
- Rhytidoponera croesus Emery, 1901
- Rhytidoponera dubia Crawley, 1915
- Rhytidoponera enigmatica Ward, 1980
- Rhytidoponera eremita Clark, 1936
- Rhytidoponera ferruginea Clark, 1936
- Rhytidoponera flavicornis Clark, 1936
- Rhytidoponera flavipes (Clark, 1941)
- Rhytidoponera flindersi Clark, 1936
- Rhytidoponera foreli Crawley, 1918
- Rhytidoponera foveolata Crawley, 1925
- Rhytidoponera fuliginosa Clark, 1936
- Rhytidoponera greavesi Clark, 1941
- Rhytidoponera gregoryi Clark, 1936
- Rhytidoponera haeckeli (Forel, 1910)
- Rhytidoponera hilli Crawley, 1915
- Rhytidoponera impressa (Mayr, 1876) – Blue pony ant
- Rhytidoponera incisa Crawley, 1915
- Rhytidoponera inornata Crawley, 1922
- Rhytidoponera kurandensis Brown, 1958
- Rhytidoponera lamellinodis Santschi, 1919
- Rhytidoponera laticeps Forel, 1915
- Rhytidoponera levior Crawley, 1925
- Rhytidoponera maledicta Forel, 1915
- Rhytidoponera maniae (Forel, 1900)
- Rhytidoponera mayri (Emery, 1883)
- Rhytidoponera metallica (Smith, 1858) – Green-head ant
- Rhytidoponera micans Clark, 1936
- Rhytidoponera mirabilis Clark, 1936
- Rhytidoponera nitida Clark, 1936
- Rhytidoponera nodifera (Emery, 1895)
- Rhytidoponera nudata (Mayr, 1876)
- Rhytidoponera peninsularis Brown, 1958
- Rhytidoponera pilosula Clark, 1936
- Rhytidoponera punctata (Smith, 1858) – Speckled pony ant
- Rhytidoponera punctigera Crawley, 1925
- Rhytidoponera punctiventris (Forel, 1900)
- Rhytidoponera purpurea (Emery, 1887)
- Rhytidoponera reflexa Clark, 1936
- Rhytidoponera reticulata (Forel, 1893) – Netted pony ant
- Rhytidoponera rufescens (Forel, 1900)
- Rhytidoponera rufithorax Clark, 1941
- Rhytidoponera rufiventris Forel, 1915
- Rhytidoponera rufonigra Clark, 1936
- Rhytidoponera scaberrima (Emery, 1895)
- Rhytidoponera scabra (Mayr, 1876)
- Rhytidoponera scabrior Crawley, 1925
- Rhytidoponera socra (Forel, 1894)
- Rhytidoponera spoliata (Emery, 1895)
- Rhytidoponera tasmaniensis Emery, 1898
- Rhytidoponera taurus (Forel, 1910) – Greater horned pony ant
- Rhytidoponera tenuis (Forel, 1900) – Delicate pony ant
- Rhytidoponera trachypyx Brown, 1958
- Rhytidoponera turneri (Forel, 1910) – Sharkskinned pony ant
- Rhytidoponera tyloxys Brown & Douglas, 1958 – Killer pony ant
- Rhytidoponera victoriae (André, 1896)
- Rhytidoponera violacea (Forel, 1907)
- Rhytidoponera viridis (Clark, 1941)
- Rhytidoponera yorkensis Forel, 1915

== Romblonella ==
- Romblonella heatwolei Taylor, 1991

== Solenopsis ==
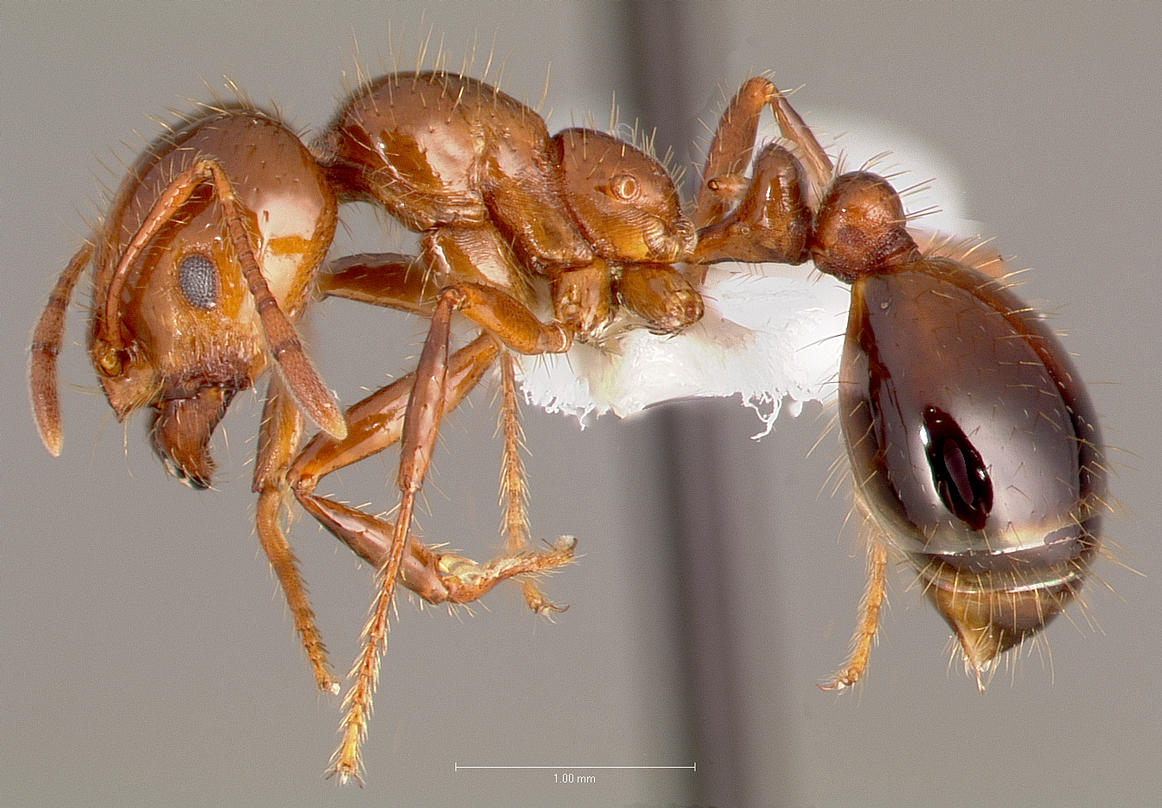
Solenopsis invicta

- Solenopsis belisarius Forel, 1907
- Solenopsis clarki Crawley, 1922
- Solenopsis froggatti Forel, 1913
- Solenopsis fusciventris Clark, 1934
- Solenopsis geminata (Fabricius, 1804) (Note: Introduced species to Australia that is present in the Northern Territory, although a nest was found in Perth, Western Australia.) – Ginger ant/Tropical fire ant
- Solenopsis insculpta Clark, 1938
- Solenopsis invicta Buren, 1972 (Note: Introduced species to Australia, with the first detection occurring in 2001 in Brisbane, Queensland. Populations of the Red imported fire ant were also recently discovered in Port Botany in Sydney. Further populations have been discovered at a Brisbane airport in late 2015.) – Red imported fire ant
- Solenopsis pachycera (Forel, 1915)

== Stereomyrmex ==
- Stereomyrmex anderseni (Taylor, 1991)

== Stigmacros ==
- Stigmacros aciculata McAreavey, 1957
- Stigmacros acuta McAreavey, 1957
- Stigmacros aemula (Forel, 1907)
- Stigmacros anthracina McAreavey, 1957
- Stigmacros armstrongi McAreavey, 1957
- Stigmacros australis (Forel, 1902)
- Stigmacros barretti Santschi, 1928
- Stigmacros bosii (Forel, 1902)
- Stigmacros brachytera McAreavey, 1957
- Stigmacros brevispina McAreavey, 1957
- Stigmacros brooksi McAreavey, 1957
- Stigmacros castanea McAreavey, 1957
- Stigmacros clarki McAreavey, 1957
- Stigmacros clivispina (Forel, 1902)
- Stigmacros debilis Bolton, 1995
- Stigmacros elegans McAreavey, 1949
- Stigmacros epinotalis McAreavey, 1957
- Stigmacros extreminigra McAreavey, 1957
- Stigmacros ferruginea McAreavey, 1957
- Stigmacros flava McAreavey, 1957
- Stigmacros flavinodis Clark, 1938
- Stigmacros fossulata Viehmeyer, 1925
- Stigmacros froggatti (Forel, 1902)
- Stigmacros glauerti McAreavey, 1957
- Stigmacros hirsuta McAreavey, 1957
- Stigmacros impressa McAreavey, 1957
- Stigmacros inermis McAreavey, 1957
- Stigmacros intacta (Viehmeyer, 1925)
- Stigmacros lanaris McAreavey, 1957
- Stigmacros major McAreavey, 1957
- Stigmacros marginata McAreavey, 1957
- Stigmacros medioreticulata (Viehmeyer, 1925)
- Stigmacros minor McAreavey, 1957
- Stigmacros nitida McAreavey, 1957
- Stigmacros occidentalis (Crawley, 1922)
- Stigmacros pilosella (Viehmeyer, 1925)
- Stigmacros proxima McAreavey, 1957
- Stigmacros punctatissima McAreavey, 1957
- Stigmacros pusilla McAreavey, 1957
- Stigmacros rectangularis McAreavey, 1957
- Stigmacros reticulata Clark, 1930
- Stigmacros rufa McAreavey, 1957
- Stigmacros sordida McAreavey, 1957
- Stigmacros spinosa McAreavey, 1957
- Stigmacros stanleyi McAreavey, 1957
- Stigmacros striata McAreavey, 1957
- Stigmacros termitoxena Wheeler, 1936
- Stigmacros wilsoni McAreavey, 1957

== Stigmatomma ==
References:

- Stigmatomma exiguum (Clark, 1928)
- Stigmatomma glauerti (Clark, 1928)
- Stigmatomma gracile (Clark, 1934)
- Stigmatomma lucidum (Clark, 1934)
- Stigmatomma punctulatum (Clark, 1934)
- Stigmatomma smithi (Brown, 1960)
- Stigmatomma wilsoni (Clark, 1928)

== Strumigenys ==
- Strumigenys alexetrix Bolton, 2000
- Strumigenys anchis Bolton, 2000
- Strumigenys anderseni Bolton, 2000
- Strumigenys anetes Brown, 1988
- Strumigenys belua Bolton, 2000
- Strumigenys bibis Bolton, 2000
- Strumigenys buleru Brown, 1988
- Strumigenys chyzeri Emery, 1897
- Strumigenys cingatrix Bolton, 2000
- Strumigenys cochlearis Brown, 1988
- Strumigenys deuteras Bolton, 2000
- Strumigenys dysanetes Bolton, 2000
- Strumigenys emdeni Forel, 1915
- Strumigenys emmae (Emery, 1890)
- Strumigenys enanna Bolton, 2000
- Strumigenys ferocior Brown, 1973
- Strumigenys flagellata (Taylor, 1962)
- Strumigenys friedae Forel, 1915
- Strumigenys geryon Bolton, 2000
- Strumigenys godeffroyi Mayr, 1866
- Strumigenys gryphon Bolton, 2000
- Strumigenys guttulata Forel, 1902
- Strumigenys harpyia Bolton, 2000
- Strumigenys jugis Bolton, 2000
- Strumigenys juxta Bolton, 2000
- Strumigenys karawajewi (Brown, 1948)
- Strumigenys lycosa Bolton, 2000
- Strumigenys mayri Emery, 1897
- Strumigenys membranifera (Emery, 1869)
- Strumigenys mesedsura Bolton, 2000
- Strumigenys minax Bolton, 2000
- Strumigenys miniteras Bolton, 2000
- Strumigenys nummula Bolton, 2000
- Strumigenys opaca Brown, 1954
- Strumigenys orthanetes Bolton, 2000
- Strumigenys paranetes Brown, 1988
- Strumigenys peetersi Bolton, 2000
- Strumigenys perplexa (Smith, 1876)
- Strumigenys philiporum Brown, 1988
- Strumigenys pnyxia Bolton, 2000
- Strumigenys quinquedentata Crawley, 1923
- Strumigenys racabura Bolton, 2000
- Strumigenys radix Bolton, 2000
- Strumigenys segrex Bolton, 2000
- Strumigenys semicompta (Brown, 1959)
- Strumigenys semirex Bolton, 2000
- Strumigenys shattucki Bolton, 2000
- Strumigenys sutrix Bolton, 2000
- Strumigenys szalayi Emery, 1897
- Strumigenys tisisyx Bolton, 2000
- Strumigenys undras Bolton, 2000
- Strumigenys varanga Bolton, 2000
- Strumigenys xenos Brown, 1955
- Strumigenys yaleopleura Brown, 1988
- Strumigenys zygon Bolton, 2000

== Syllophopsis ==
- Syllophopsis australica (Forel 1907)
- Syllophopsis sechellensis (Emery, 1894)
- Syllophopsis subcoeca (Emery, 1894)

== Tapinoma ==
- Tapinoma melanocephalum (Fabricius, 1793) (Note: Introduced species to Australia. The earliest occurrence of the ant was recorded in 1932.) – Ghost ant
- Tapinoma minutum Mayr, 1862 – Dwarf pecdicel ant

== Technomyrmex ==
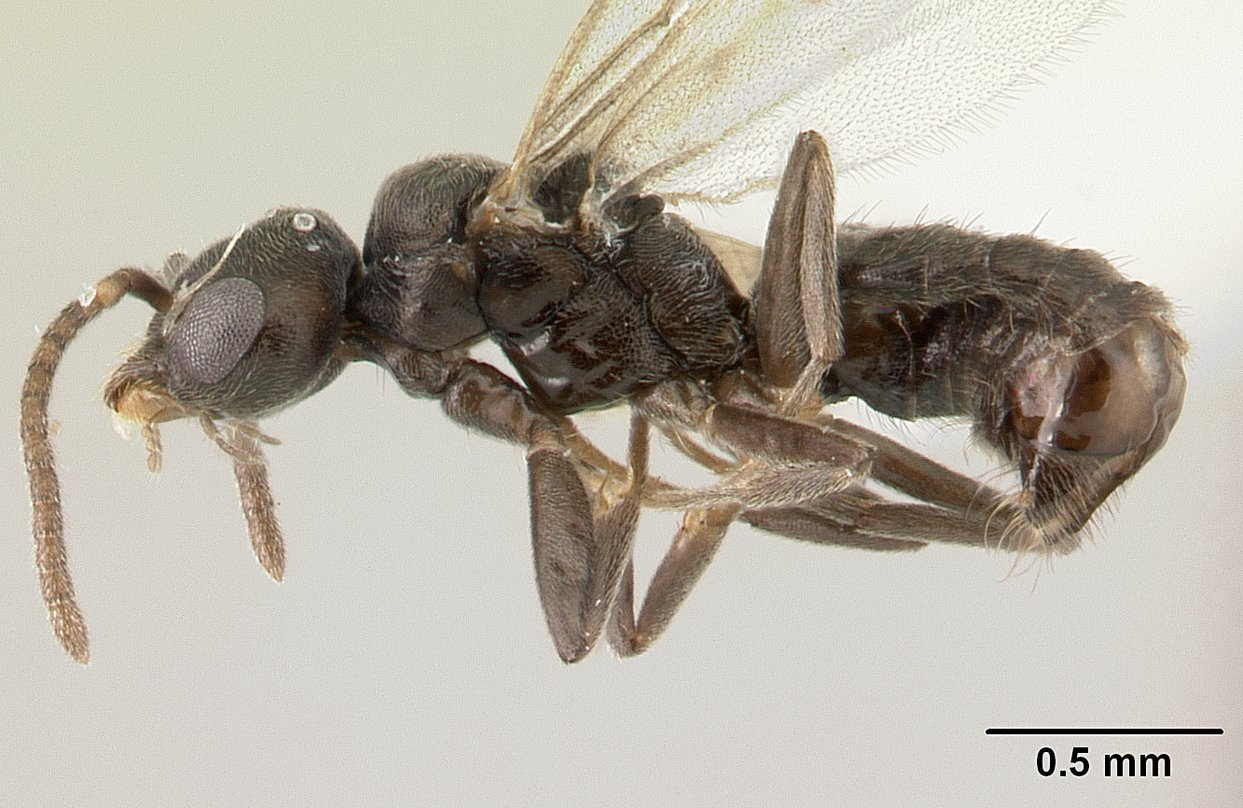
Technomyrmex jocosus

- Technomyrmex albipes (Smith, 1861) (Note: Introduced species to Australia. It is widespread in the country.) – White-footed ant
- Technomyrmex antonii Forel, 1902
- Technomyrmex australops Bolton, 2007
- Technomyrmex cedarensis Forel, 1915
- Technomyrmex cheesmanae Donisthorpe, 1945
- Technomyrmex difficilis Forel, 1892 (Note: Introduced species to Australia. The earliest known record of the ants presence was in 1972, around the northern regions of Australia.)
- Technomyrmex furens Bolton, 2007
- Technomyrmex jocosus Forel, 1910 (Note: Introduced species to Australia. The species was recently found in the British West Indies in 2003 and first recorded in the United States in 1986.) – White-footed house ant
- Technomyrmex nitens Bolton, 2007
- Technomyrmex quadricolor (Wheeler, 1930)
- Technomyrmex shattucki Bolton, 2007
- Technomyrmex sophiae Forel, 1902

== Teratomyrmex ==
- Teratomyrmex greavesi McAreavey, 1957
- Teratomyrmex substrictus Shattuck & O'Reilly, 2013
- Teratomyrmex tinae Shattuck & O'Reilly, 2013

== Tetramorium ==
- Tetramorium andrynicum Bolton, 1977
- Tetramorium antipodum Wheeler, 1927
- Tetramorium bicarinatum (Nylander, 1846) (Note: Introduced species to Australia. Earliest records indicate that the first occurrence of the ant was in 1858.) – Guinea ant
- Tetramorium capitale (McAreavey, 1949)
- Tetramorium confusum Bolton, 1977
- Tetramorium deceptum Bolton, 1977
- Tetramorium fuscipes (Viehmeyer, 1925)
- Tetramorium impressum (Viehmeyer, 1925) – Impressive pennant ant
- Tetramorium lanuginosum Mayr, 1870
- Tetramorium laticephalum Bolton, 1977 – Harvester pennant ant
- Tetramorium megalops Bolton, 1977
- Tetramorium melleum Emery, 1897
- Tetramorium ornatum Emery, 1897
- Tetramorium pacificum Mayr, 1870 – Pacific pennant ant
- Tetramorium simillimum (Smith, 1851) (Note: Introduced species to Australia. The species is known to be widespread in the country.)
- Tetramorium sjostedti Forel, 1915 – Giant pennant ant
- Tetramorium spininode Bolton, 1977 – Royal pennant ant
- Tetramorium splendidior (Viehmeyer, 1925) – Splended pennant ant
- Tetramorium strictum Bolton, 1977
- Tetramorium striolatum Viehmeyer, 1913 – Common pennant ant
- Tetramorium taylori Bolton, 1985
- Tetramorium thalidum Bolton, 1977
- Tetramorium turneri Forel, 1902
- Tetramorium validiusculum Emery, 1897
- Tetramorium viehmeyeri Forel, 1907
- Tetramorium wroughtonii Forel, 1902

== Tetraponera ==
- Tetraponera allaborans (Walker, 1859)
- Tetraponera laeviceps (Smith, 1859)
- Tetraponera nitida (Smith, 1860) – Toothed black tree-ant
- Tetraponera nixa Ward, 2001
- Tetraponera punctulata Smith, 1877 – Savanna black tree ant
- Tetraponera rotula Ward, 2001
- Tetraponera tucurua Ward, 2001

== Trichomyrmex ==
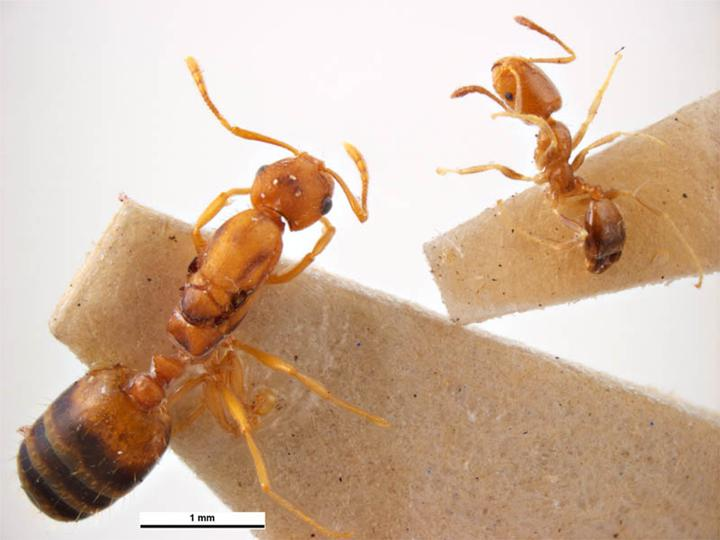
Trichomyrmex destructor

- Trichomyrmex destructor (Jerdon, 1851) – introduced species – Singapore ant

== Turneria ==
- Turneria bidentata Forel, 1895
- Turneria frenchi Forel, 1911
- Turneria rosschinga Shattuck, 2011

== Vollenhovia ==
- Vollenhovia oblonga (Smith, 1860)

== Vombisidris ==
- Vombisidris australis (Wheeler, 1934)
- Vombisidris renateae (Taylor, 1989)

== Wasmannia ==
- Wasmannia auropunctata (Roger, 1863) – introduced species

== Zasphinctus ==
- Zasphinctus asper Brown, 1975
- Zasphinctus cedaris Forel, 1915
- Zasphinctus clarus (Forel, 1893)
- Zasphinctus duchaussoyi (Andre, 1905)
- Zasphinctus emeryi (Forel, 1893)
- Zasphinctus froggatti Forel, 1900
- Zasphinctus imbecilis Forel, 1907
- Zasphinctus mjobergi Forel, 1915
- Zasphinctus myops Forel, 1895
- Zasphinctus nigricans (Clark, 1926)
- Zasphinctus occidentalis (Clark, 1923)
- Zasphinctus septentrionalis (Crawley, 1925)
- Zasphinctus steinheili Forel, 1900
- Zasphinctus trux Brown, 1975
- Zasphinctus turneri Forel, 1900

== Incertae sedis ==
Species listed below were described in Australia as their type locality, but their true identities remain unknown.

- Formica amyoti Le Guillou, 1842
- Formica inequalis Lowne, 1865
- Formica minuta Lowne, 1865

== See also ==
- List of ant genera
- List of ant subfamilies
