= Iridomyrmex setoconus =

Scientific classification
- Kingdom: Animalia
- Phylum: Arthropoda
- Class: Insecta
- Order: Hymenoptera
- Family: Formicidae
- Subfamily: Dolichoderinae
- Genus: Iridomyrmex
- Species: I. setoconus

Binomial name
- Iridomyrmex setoconus Shattuck & McMillan, 1998

Species of ant

Iridomyrmex setoconus is a species of ant in the genus Iridomyrmex. Described by Shattuck and McMillan in 1998, the species is endemic to Australia, and small populations have only been found in Esperance.

== See also ==
- List of ants of Australia
