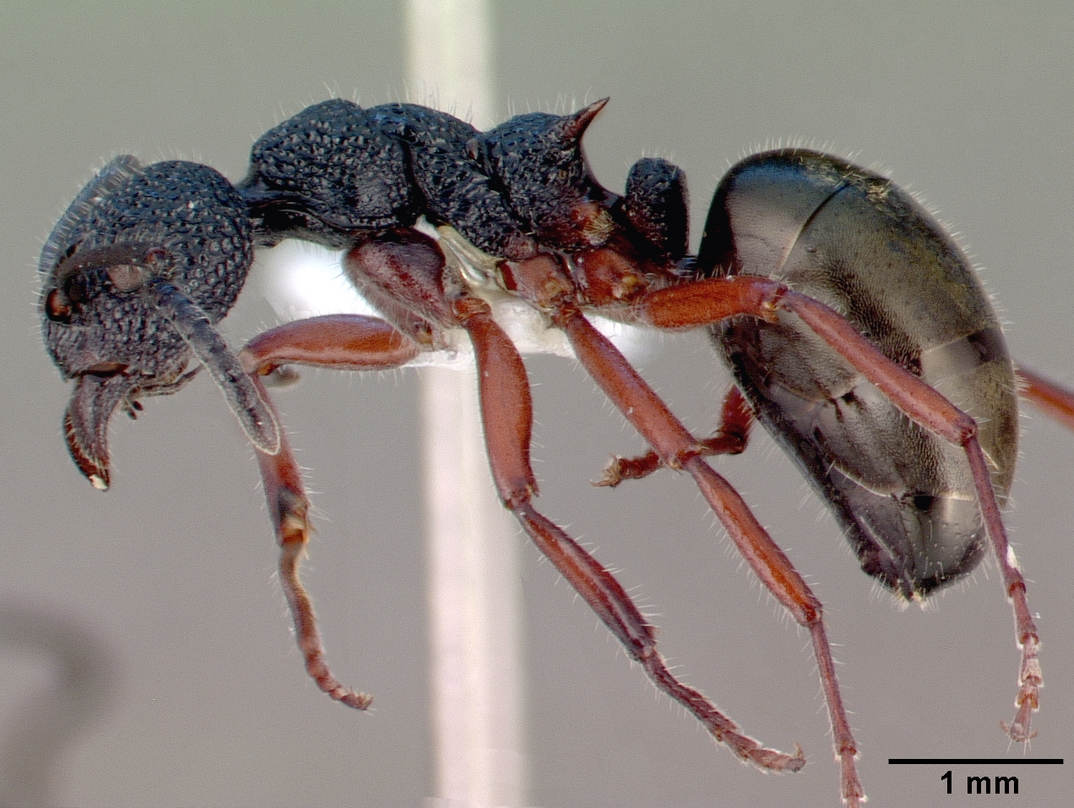

Scientific classification
- Kingdom: Animalia
- Phylum: Arthropoda
- Class: Insecta
- Order: Hymenoptera
- Family: Formicidae
- Subfamily: Dolichoderinae
- Genus: Dolichoderus
- Species: D. scabridus

Binomial name
- Dolichoderus scabridus Roger, 1862

Synonyms
- Polyrhachis foveolatus Lowne, 1865; Dolichoderus scabridus ruficornis Santschi, 1916

= Dolichoderus scabridus =

Species of ant

Dolichoderus scabridus is a species of ant in the genus Dolichoderus. Described by Julius Roger in 1862, the species is among the most frequently encountered species in Australia.
