= Dolichoderus scrobiculatus =

Scientific classification
- Kingdom: Animalia
- Phylum: Arthropoda
- Class: Insecta
- Order: Hymenoptera
- Family: Formicidae
- Subfamily: Dolichoderinae
- Genus: Dolichoderus
- Species: D. scrobiculatus

Binomial name
- Dolichoderus scrobiculatus (Mayr, 1876)

Species of ant

Dolichoderus scrobiculatus is a species of ant in the genus Dolichoderus. Described by Mayr in 1876, the species is endemic to Australia.
