= Iridomyrmex roseatus =

Scientific classification
- Kingdom: Animalia
- Phylum: Arthropoda
- Class: Insecta
- Order: Hymenoptera
- Family: Formicidae
- Subfamily: Dolichoderinae
- Genus: Iridomyrmex
- Species: I. roseatus

Binomial name
- Iridomyrmex roseatus Heterick & Shattuck, 2011

Species of ant

Iridomyrmex roseatus is a species of ant in the genus Iridomyrmex. Described by Heterick and Shattuck in 2011, the species has a northern temperate and tropical distribution in Australia, and can be found in most states, and the habitats of the ant may be similar to the preferences of the Meat ant species.

== Etymology ==
The name of the ant derives from the Latin language, and translates as 'dressed in pink'.
