= Iridomyrmex obsidianus =

Scientific classification
- Domain: Eukaryota
- Kingdom: Animalia
- Phylum: Arthropoda
- Class: Insecta
- Order: Hymenoptera
- Family: Formicidae
- Subfamily: Dolichoderinae
- Genus: Iridomyrmex
- Species: I. obsidianus

Binomial name
- Iridomyrmex obsidianus Emery, 1914

Species of ant

Iridomyrmex obsidianus is a species of ant in the genus Iridomyrmex. Described by Carlo Emery in 1914, the species can only be found in New Caledonia.
