= Iridomyrmex victorianus =

Scientific classification
- Kingdom: Animalia
- Phylum: Arthropoda
- Class: Insecta
- Order: Hymenoptera
- Family: Formicidae
- Subfamily: Dolichoderinae
- Genus: Iridomyrmex
- Species: I. victorianus

Binomial name
- Iridomyrmex victorianus Forel, 1902

Synonyms
- Iridomyrmex emeryi Crawley, 1918; Iridomyrmex mattiroloi parcens Forel, 1907

Species of ant

Iridomyrmex victorianus is a species of ant in the genus Iridomyrmex. Described by Auguste-Henri Forel in 1902, the species distributed to the east coast in Australia. The species usually takes an opportunity of using other nests constructed by larger ants, usually abandoned, and some were found in a bull ant nest (Myrmecia pyriformis).
