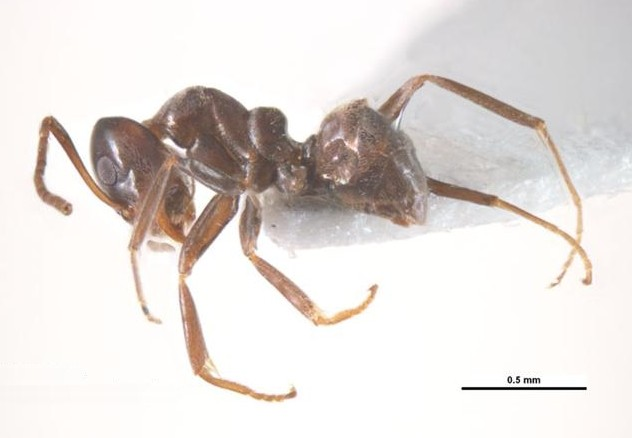

Scientific classification
- Kingdom: Animalia
- Phylum: Arthropoda
- Class: Insecta
- Order: Hymenoptera
- Family: Formicidae
- Subfamily: Dolichoderinae
- Genus: Iridomyrmex
- Species: I. gibbus

Binomial name
- Iridomyrmex gibbus Heterick & Shattuck, 2011

= Iridomyrmex gibbus =

Species of ant

Iridomyrmex gibbus is a species of ant in the genus Iridomyrmex. Described by Heterick and Shattuck in 2011, the biology of the ant is not exactly known, although it is known that the ant is distributed in several states and in Barrow Island in Australia.

== Etymology ==
The name derives from the Latin language, and it translates as 'humpbacked'.
