= Camponotus ephippium =

Scientific classification
- Kingdom: Animalia
- Phylum: Arthropoda
- Class: Insecta
- Order: Hymenoptera
- Family: Formicidae
- Subfamily: Formicinae
- Genus: Camponotus
- Subgenus: Myrmophyma
- Species: C. ephippium

Binomial name
- Camponotus ephippium Smith F., 1858

Species of ant

Camponotus ephippium is a species of carpenter ant (genus Camponotus) found in Australia. It has two subspecies, C. ephippium ephippium and C. ephippium narses.
