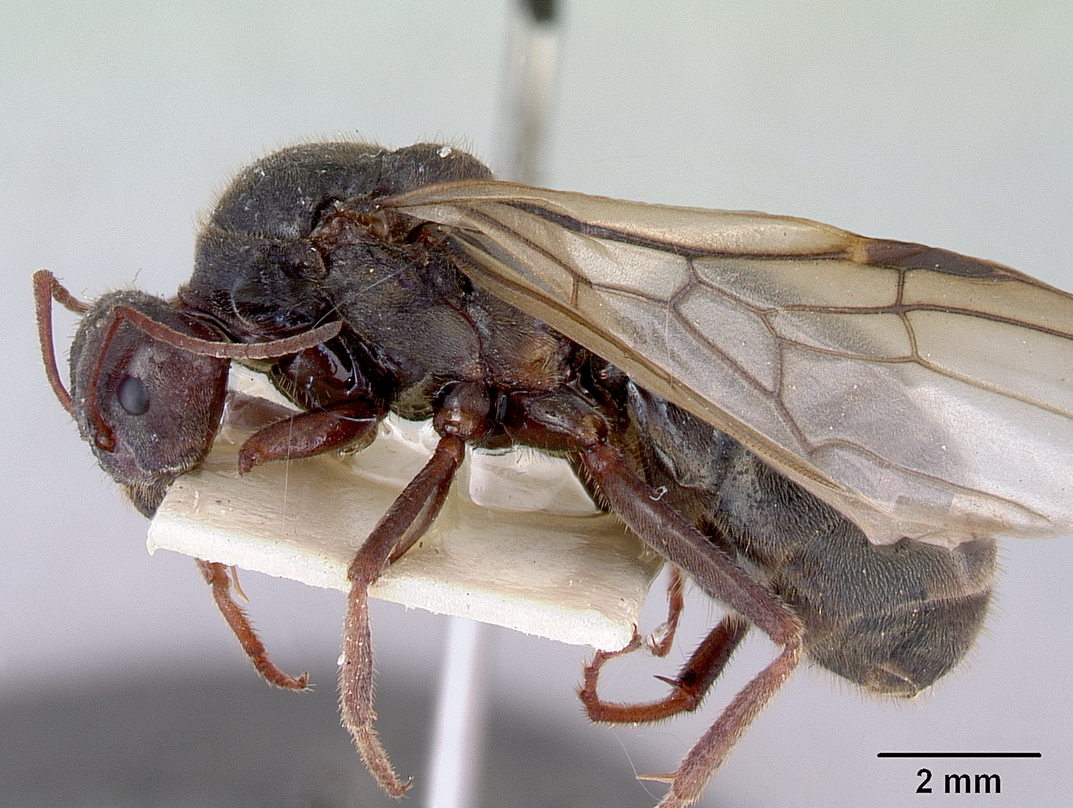

Scientific classification
- Kingdom: Animalia
- Phylum: Arthropoda
- Class: Insecta
- Order: Hymenoptera
- Family: Formicidae
- Subfamily: Dolichoderinae
- Genus: Iridomyrmex
- Species: I. lividus

Binomial name
- Iridomyrmex lividus Shattuck, 1993

= Iridomyrmex lividus =

Species of ant

Iridomyrmex lividus is a species of ant in the genus Iridomyrmex. Described by Shattuck in 1993, the ant is endemic to Australia and resembles a similar appearance to the Meat ant (Iridomyrmex purpureus).
