= Iridomyrmex mattiroloi =

Scientific classification
- Kingdom: Animalia
- Phylum: Arthropoda
- Class: Insecta
- Order: Hymenoptera
- Family: Formicidae
- Subfamily: Dolichoderinae
- Genus: Iridomyrmex
- Species: I. mattiroloi

Binomial name
- Iridomyrmex mattiroloi Emery, 1898

Species of ant

Iridomyrmex mattiroloi is a species of ant in the genus Iridomyrmex. Described by Carlo Emery in 1898, the species is only endemic to Tasmania in Australia, commonly seen foraging on low vegetation.
