= Dolichoderus goudiei =

Scientific classification
- Kingdom: Animalia
- Phylum: Arthropoda
- Class: Insecta
- Order: Hymenoptera
- Family: Formicidae
- Subfamily: Dolichoderinae
- Genus: Dolichoderus
- Species: D. goudiei

Binomial name
- Dolichoderus goudiei Clark, 1930

Species of ant

Dolichoderus goudiei is a species of ant in the genus Dolichoderus. Described by John S. Clark in 1930, the species is endemic to Australia in dry sclerophyll woodlands in the southern parts of Australia, ranging from the Australian Capital Territory to South Australia. They forage on low vegetation and tree trunks, and this species was also intercepted in New Zealand on orchids that were being shipped from Sydney, but these populations never made establishment.
