= Dolichoderus rufotibialis =

Scientific classification
- Kingdom: Animalia
- Phylum: Arthropoda
- Class: Insecta
- Order: Hymenoptera
- Family: Formicidae
- Subfamily: Dolichoderinae
- Genus: Dolichoderus
- Species: D. rufotibialis

Binomial name
- Dolichoderus rufotibialis Clark, 1930

Species of ant

Dolichoderus rufotibialis is a species of ant in the genus Dolichoderus. Described by John S. Clark in 1930, the species is endemic to Australia.
