= Iridomyrmex dromus =

Scientific classification
- Kingdom: Animalia
- Phylum: Arthropoda
- Class: Insecta
- Order: Hymenoptera
- Family: Formicidae
- Subfamily: Dolichoderinae
- Genus: Iridomyrmex
- Species: I. dromus

Binomial name
- Iridomyrmex dromus Clark, 1938

Species of ant

Iridomyrmex dromus is a species of ant in the genus Iridomyrmex. Described by John S. Clark in 1938, the ant is a nocturnal species that is distributed nationwide in Australia, commonly found in habitats such as desert, dry sclerophyll and rainforests in Tasmania.
