= Dolichoderus formosus =

Scientific classification
- Kingdom: Animalia
- Phylum: Arthropoda
- Class: Insecta
- Order: Hymenoptera
- Family: Formicidae
- Subfamily: Dolichoderinae
- Genus: Dolichoderus
- Species: D. formosus

Binomial name
- Dolichoderus formosus Clark, 1930

Synonyms
- Dolichoderus occidentalis Clark, 1930

Species of ant

Dolichoderus formosus is a species of ant in the genus Dolichoderus. Described by John S. Clark in 1930, the species is endemic to Australia, and it is commonly found in Western Australia and South Australia. It is found in scrub like habitats, and colonies are commonly found under rocks.
