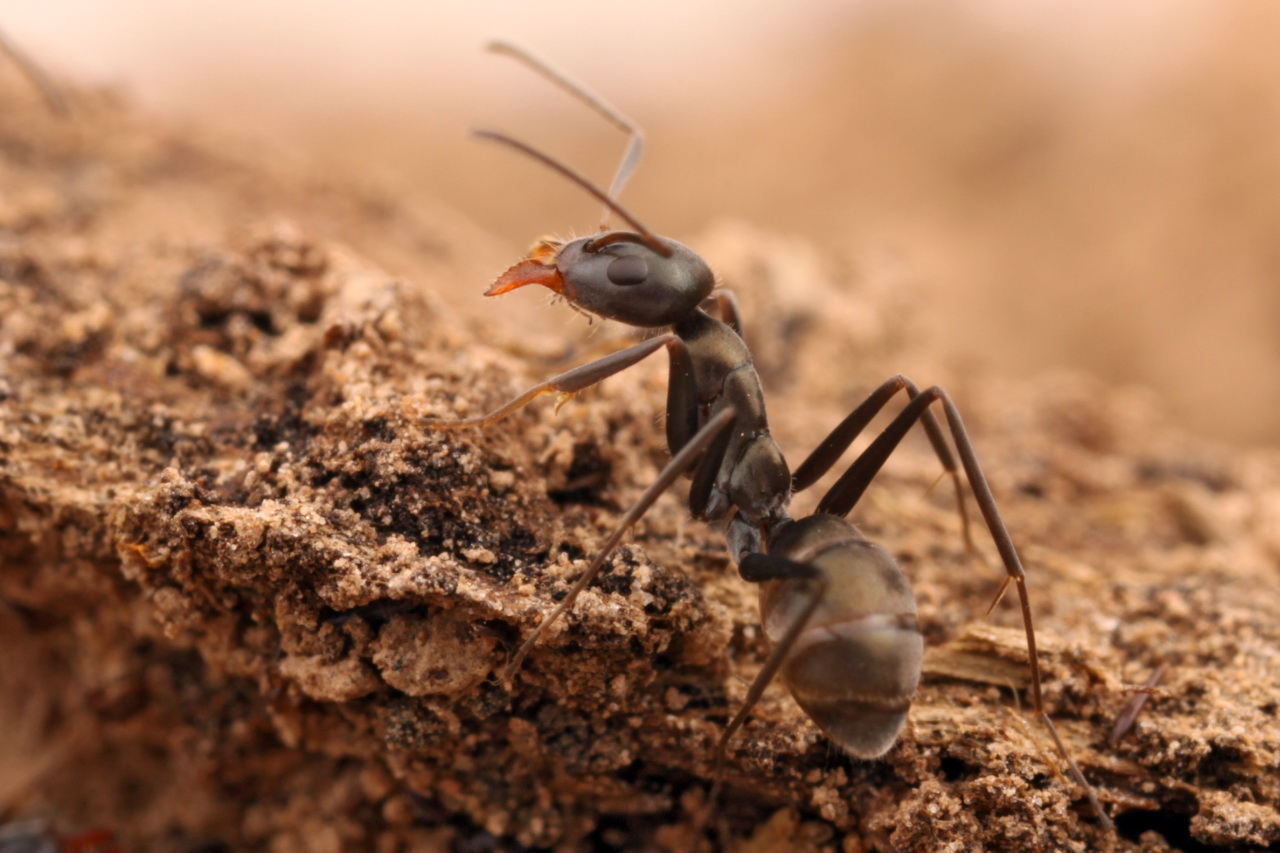

Scientific classification
- Kingdom: Animalia
- Phylum: Arthropoda
- Class: Insecta
- Order: Hymenoptera
- Family: Formicidae
- Subfamily: Dolichoderinae
- Genus: Iridomyrmex
- Species: I. splendens

Binomial name
- Iridomyrmex splendens Forel, 1907

Synonyms
- Iridomyrmex vicina Clark, 1934

= Iridomyrmex splendens =

Species of ant

Iridomyrmex splendens is a species of ant in the genus Iridomyrmex. Described by Auguste-Henri Forel in 1907, the ant is mainly distributed in the southern regions of Australia, commonly found in dry sclerophyll woodland, and nests are found under logs.
