= Iridomyrmex brunneus =

Scientific classification
- Kingdom: Animalia
- Phylum: Arthropoda
- Class: Insecta
- Order: Hymenoptera
- Family: Formicidae
- Subfamily: Dolichoderinae
- Genus: Iridomyrmex
- Species: I. brunneus

Binomial name
- Iridomyrmex brunneus Forel, 1902

Synonyms
- Iridomyrmex gracilis fusciventris Forel, 1913

Species of ant

Iridomyrmex brunneus is a species of ant in the genus Iridomyrmex. Described by Auguste-Henri Forel in 1902, the species is widespread in Australia, and is considered a household pest.
