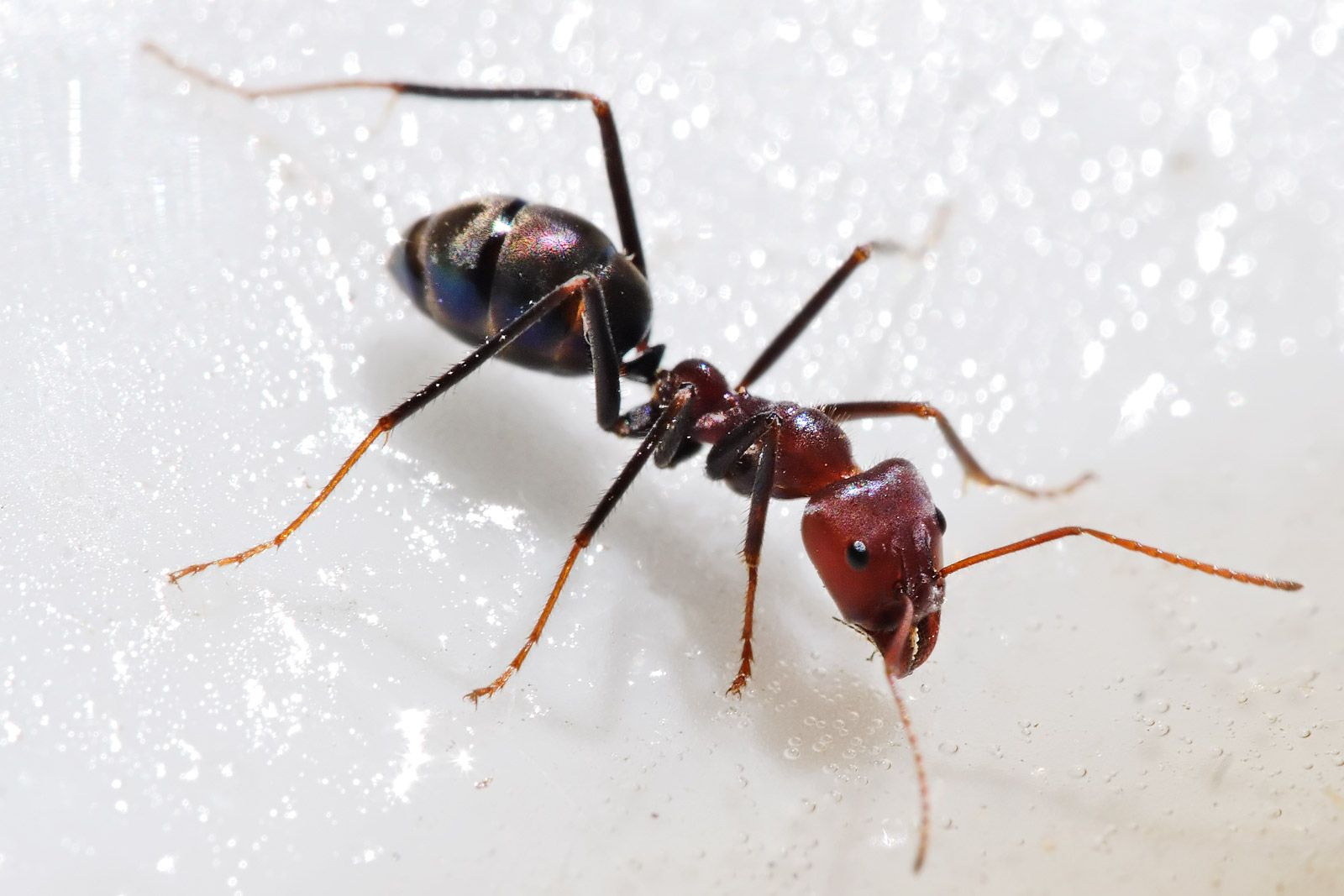
- Meat ant (I. purpureus)

Scientific classification
- Kingdom: Animalia
- Phylum: Arthropoda
- Clade: Pancrustacea
- Class: Insecta
- Order: Hymenoptera
- Family: Formicidae
- Subfamily: Dolichoderinae
- Tribe: Leptomyrmecini
- Genus: Iridomyrmex; Mayr, 1862

Type species
- Formica detecta Smith, 1858

Diversity
- c. 79 extant species 5 fossil species

= Iridomyrmex =

Iridomyrmex Temporal range: 35.6–0 Ma Eocene to present

Genus of ants

Iridomyrmex is a genus of ants called rainbow ants (referring to their blue-green iridescent sheen) first described by Austrian entomologist Gustav Mayr in 1862. He placed the genus in the subfamily Dolichoderinae of the family Formicidae. It has 79 described species and five fossil species. Most of these ants are native to Australia; others are found in Asia and Oceania, and they have been introduced to Brazil, New Zealand, and the United Arab Emirates. Fossil species are known from China, France, and the United States.

These ants are known to be an ecologically dominant and important group of ants, but they are sometimes regarded as pests because they disturb soil and enter human houses. Farmers in rural Australia place animal carcasses on meat ant (I. purpureus) mounds as a method of disposing of them; meat ants consume the carcass and reduce it to bones in a matter of weeks. Meat ants also engage in ritualised fighting, which helps prevent casualties and solve territorial disputes between neighbouring colonies. The largest members of this genus are those of the I. purpureus species group, measuring 8 mm (0.31 in).

After their nuptial flight, queen ants may establish a colony by themselves, by budding, or cooperatively, where a subset of the colony migrates to a new location or when multiple queens help find a suitable nesting spot, but they display intolerance to each other when workers are present. The eggs take 44 to 61 days to fully develop into adults. Ants of the genus live in a wide variety of habitats and nest in soil in numbers that range from a few hundred individuals to over 300,000 in a single colony. Depending on the species, nests are large mounds covered in pebbles with multiple entrances, while others live above ground in twig nests. In some cases, ants dwell in several nest sites connected by paths; some of these nests can extend to 650 m (2,130 ft) in length. Some species associate with caterpillars and butterflies that provide the ants with secretions and honeydew, and I. bicknelli pollinates orchids. These ants are predators and scavengers; they hunt for prey to feed their young. Notably, these ants are immune to the toxins of the cane toad and feed on the juveniles. Predators such as spiders, birds, lizards, and other ants prey on Iridomyrmex ants.

== Phylogeny ==
The separation of the genus Iridomyrmex from its most recent common ancestor began around 12 million years ago. Its sister group, Froggattella, has only two species, even though both genera are the same age. In comparison to other Indo-Australian genera in the subfamily Dolichoderinae, the clade of which it is a part, is 23 million years old, meaning that it is rather young. However, the fossil species that have been found are from the Eocene and Oligocene. The following cladogram shows the phylogenetic position of Iridomyrmex among the Indo-Australian genera:

- Indo‑Australian genera
  - - Doleromyrma
    - - - Anonychomyrma
        - Nebothriomyrmex
  - - Papyrius
    - - Philidris
      - - Turneria
        - - Ochetellus
          - - Froggattella
            - Iridomyrmex

== Taxonomy ==
The genus Iridomyrmex was first described by Austrian entomologist Gustav Mayr in 1862, but it had no designated type species until 1903. By then, the type species was designated as Formica detecta, a synonym of Iridomyrmex purpureus. The genus was placed in the subfamily Dolichoderinae in 1878, the same year the subfamily was established. Since the establishment of the genus, it suffered taxonomic misunderstanding due to the gradual development of unrelated ants being designated into the genus by early researchers who failed to identify features that would make them distinct from the genus Iridomyrmex.

Myrmecologist William Brown Jr., was perhaps the first person to question the monophyly of the genus, mentioning that the Argentine ant, a former member of Iridomyrmex, differed from the rest of the genus. The first proper revisions of the genus began in the 1990s, and 91 species were transferred to six genera; only 62 species remained after these revisions. These species were placed into the genera Anonychomyrma, Doleromyrma, Linepithema, Ochetellus, Papyrius and Philidris. In 2011, the genus was revised again, and 79 species and five extinct species were now present, 31 of which were newly described. Four species were placed in different genera while 25 species and subspecies were classified as synonyms. According to one source, 350 Australian Iridomyrmex species may be present.

The scientific name of the genus, Iridomyrmex, meaning "rainbow ant", refers to their blue-green iridescent sheen. The word Irido, meaning "rainbow", derives from Ancient Greek, and myrmex, another Greek word, means "ant".

=== Species ===
[extinct species are marked with †]

- Iridomyrmex adstringatus Heterick & Shattuck, 2011
- Iridomyrmex agilis Forel, 1907
- Iridomyrmex alpinus Heterick & Shattuck, 2011
- Iridomyrmex anceps (Roger, 1863)
- Iridomyrmex anderseni Shattuck, 1993
- Iridomyrmex angusticeps Forel, 1901
- Iridomyrmex anteroinclinus Shattuck, 1993
- Iridomyrmex atypicus Heterick & Shattuck, 2011
- Iridomyrmex azureus Viehmeyer, 1914
- Iridomyrmex bicknelli Emery, 1898
- Iridomyrmex bigi Shattuck, 1993
- Iridomyrmex brennani Heterick & Shattuck, 2011
- †Iridomyrmex breviantennis Théobald, 1937
- Iridomyrmex brunneus Forel, 1902
- Iridomyrmex calvus Emery, 1914
- Iridomyrmex cappoinclinus Shattuck, 1993
- Iridomyrmex cephaloinclinus Shattuck, 1993
- Iridomyrmex chasei Forel, 1902
- Iridomyrmex coeruleus Heterick & Shattuck, 2011
- Iridomyrmex conifer Forel, 1902
- Iridomyrmex continentis Forel, 1907
- Iridomyrmex cuneiceps Heterick & Shattuck, 2011
- Iridomyrmex cupreus Heterick & Shattuck, 2011
- Iridomyrmex curvifrons Heterick & Shattuck, 2011
- Iridomyrmex cyaneus Wheeler, 1915
- Iridomyrmex difficilis Heterick & Shattuck, 2011
- Iridomyrmex discors Forel, 1902
- Iridomyrmex dromus Clark, 1938
- Iridomyrmex elongatus Heterick & Shattuck, 2011
- Iridomyrmex exsanguis Forel, 1907
- †Iridomyrmex florissantius Carpenter, 1930
- Iridomyrmex fulgens Heterick & Shattuck, 2011
- Iridomyrmex galbanus Shattuck, 1993
- Iridomyrmex gibbus Heterick & Shattuck, 2011
- Iridomyrmex gumnos Heterick & Shattuck, 2011
- Iridomyrmex hartmeyeri Forel, 1907
- Iridomyrmex hertogi Heterick & Shattuck, 2011
- Iridomyrmex hesperus Shattuck, 1993
- Iridomyrmex infuscus Heterick & Shattuck, 2011
- Iridomyrmex innocens Forel, 1907
- Iridomyrmex lividus Shattuck, 1993
- Iridomyrmex longisoma Heterick & Shattuck, 2011
- Iridomyrmex luteoclypeatus Heterick & Shattuck, 2011
- Iridomyrmex macrops Heterick & Shattuck, 2011
- †Iridomyrmex mapesi Wilson, 1985
- Iridomyrmex mattiroloi Emery, 1898
- Iridomyrmex mayri Forel, 1915
- Iridomyrmex meridianus Heterick & Shattuck, 2011
- Iridomyrmex minor Forel, 1915
- Iridomyrmex mirabilis Heterick & Shattuck, 2011
- Iridomyrmex mjobergi Forel, 1915
- Iridomyrmex neocaledonica Heterick & Shattuck, 2011
- Iridomyrmex niger Heterick & Shattuck, 2011
- Iridomyrmex nudipes Heterick & Shattuck, 2011
- †Iridomyrmex obscurans Carpenter, 1930
- Iridomyrmex obscurior Forel, 1902
- Iridomyrmex obsidianus Emery, 1914
- Iridomyrmex omalonotus Heterick & Shattuck, 2011
- Iridomyrmex pallidus Forel, 1901
- Iridomyrmex phillipensis Heterick & Shattuck, 2011
- Iridomyrmex prismatis Shattuck, 1993
- Iridomyrmex purpureus (Smith, 1858)
- Iridomyrmex reburrus Shattuck, 1993
- Iridomyrmex roseatus Heterick & Shattuck, 2011
- Iridomyrmex rubriceps Forel, 1902
- Iridomyrmex rufoinclinus Shattuck, 1993
- Iridomyrmex rufoniger (Lowne, 1865)
- Iridomyrmex sanguineus Forel, 1910
- Iridomyrmex setoconus Shattuck & McMillan, 1998
- †Iridomyrmex shandongicus Zhang, 1989
- Iridomyrmex spadius Shattuck, 1993
- Iridomyrmex splendens Forel, 1907
- Iridomyrmex spodipilus Shattuck, 1993
- Iridomyrmex spurcus Wheeler, 1915
- Iridomyrmex suchieri Forel, 1907
- Iridomyrmex suchieroides Heterick & Shattuck, 2011
- Iridomyrmex tenebrans Heterick & Shattuck, 2011
- Iridomyrmex tenuiceps Heterick & Shattuck, 2011
- Iridomyrmex trigonoceps Heterick & Shattuck, 2011
- Iridomyrmex turbineus Shattuck & McMillan, 1998
- Iridomyrmex victorianus Forel, 1902
- Iridomyrmex viridiaeneus Viehmeyer, 1914
- Iridomyrmex viridigaster Clark, 1941
- Iridomyrmex xanthocoxa Heterick & Shattuck, 2011

== Description ==
Unlike other genera in Dolichoderinae, the front margin of the clypeus is not below the mandibles; instead, it is located above them. The eyes are located on top of the ants' head, and they are noticeably distant from the mandibles. These ants range from small to medium; members of the I. conifer species group measure 4 millimetres (0.16 in), being reddish-brown in colour with a distinctive propodeum, while members of the I. purpureus species group are the largest at 8 millimetres (0.31 in). Worker castes are rarely polymorphic.

Based on observations, Iridomyrmex workers can be deformed when they are born. For example, a captured specimen had its propodeum and gaster fused together, and the petiole was still present but enlarged. Despite the deformity, the worker was still able to forage with little trouble.

== Distribution and habitat ==
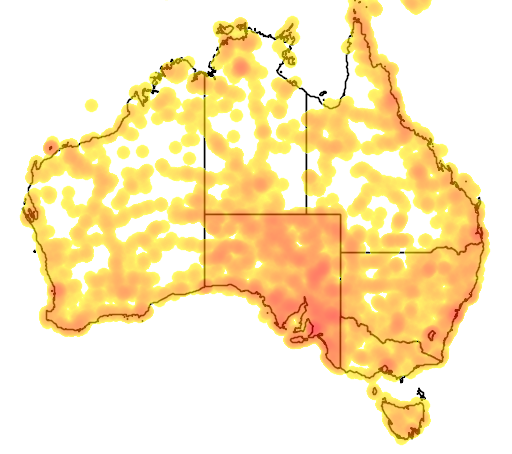
Occurrences of Iridomyrmex species reported in Australia as of May 2015

Ants of this genus are found in a range spanning several continents. In the Oceanian region, these ants are found in Fiji, Indonesia, New Caledonia, Papua New Guinea and the Solomon Islands. In Australia, they are found in every state and territory. In New Zealand, this genus has been introduced to the country, establishing themselves in both the North Island and South Island. In Asia, they are found in Burma, East Timor, India, Malaysia and the Philippines. I. anceps is the only known ant of this genus present in the Middle East, having been introduced to the United Arab Emirates. I. rufoniger was introduced to Brazil through human activity. Populations are present on the islands of Norfolk Island and Phillip Island in Oceania. Extinct species were native to a range spanning beyond the modern distribution of the genus; fossils have been found in China, France and the United States.

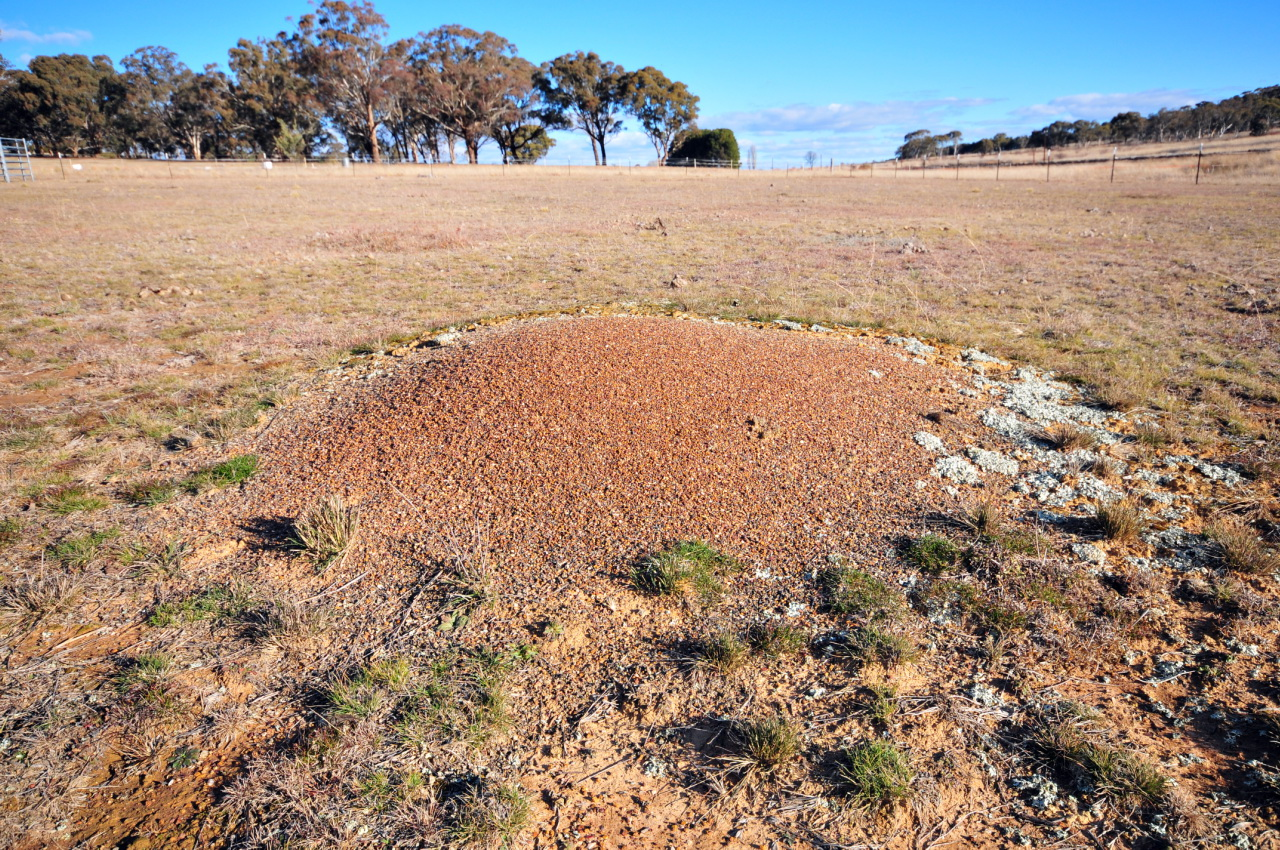
Meat ant mound near Bungendore, New South Wales

The genus Iridomyrmex inhabits rural, arid, and semi-arid areas. Nests are found in Acacia, Agathis, Banksia, Casuarina and Eucalyptus woodland, in pastures, Callitris forests, city parks, farmlands, grasslands, heath, sand dunes, savanna woodland, swamps, urban gardens, wet rain-forests, wet and dry sclerophyll woodland, and even in buildings such as hotels and houses.

Most of these ants nest in soil, but some prefer to live under rocks, rotten wood, and in some cases in sandy beaches and footpaths. Certain species will avoid nesting in sandy soil. Nests will vary in appearance; most species live in small mounds with a single entrance, while other species create large mounds covered in pebbles with multiple entrances. Some colonies are known to create "super-nests": workers construct many nests connected through established paths, extending up to 650 metres (2,130 ft) in length. In one extreme case, a single colony was found to occupy over 10 hectares of land with 85 individual nests and 1,500 entrance holes. While meat ants are never aggressive to their nest mates, they will be aggressive to those who live in different nests within the same colony. Nests may be above or below ground, with some species such as I. conifer alternating between the two; during winter, nests will be constructed above in twigs, with the ants moving back underground during the warmer months. Underground nests are located near areas where food sources are present. Colonies will relocate their nests to areas where there are reasonable levels of sunlight during winter.

== Behaviour and ecology ==
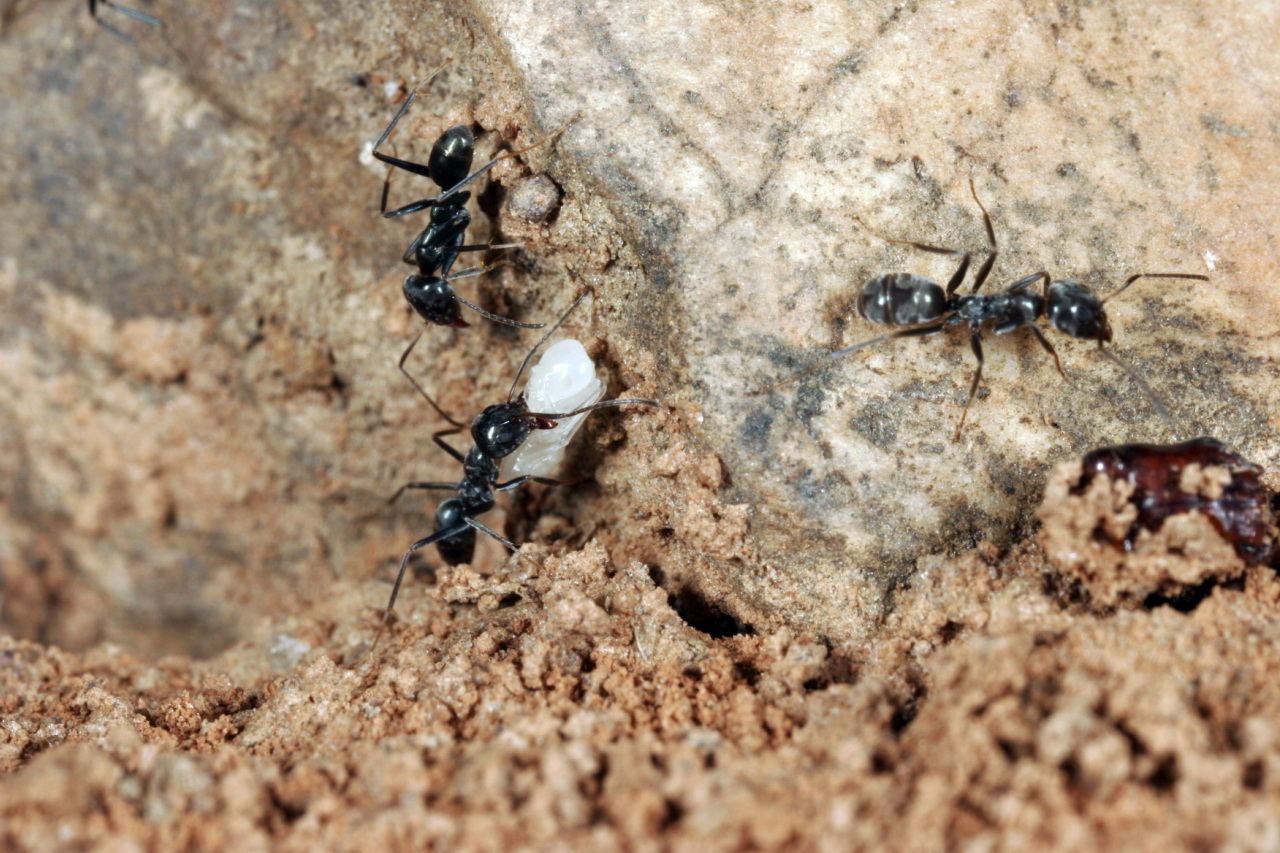
While most Iridomyrmex species are notable for their aggression, some are quite timid. This worker is moving pupae to a safer location instead of attacking intruders after the nest was exposed.

Most Iridomyrmex species are aggressive ants that will attack anything which attacks or disturbs their nests or trails they forage on. This is noticeable with particular member species of the I. purpureus species group, where they will pour out of their nest and attack and kill all intruders. Even smaller species show similar behaviours to these ants and will also swarm out of their nests to bite and spray iridomyrmecin, a defensive chemical found in the genus. Because of their large numbers, aggression, and activeness, Iridomyrmex ants are ecologically dominant in Australia, and several species are known to obtain exclusive possession to food sources and prevent other insects from using them. These ants will also affect foraging behaviours of other ant nests living nearby due to how active they are and their large numbers.

While Iridomyrmex ants are known for their aggression, some are more timid and shy; workers will run and hide if they are disturbed and avoid contact with other ant species. When nests are disturbed, workers will not attack; instead, they will relocate their brood and disregard other disturbances should they occur. Workers will hide in leaves and other vegetation, and in some cases, I. victorianus workers may remain still until any threat or danger subsides.

Meat ants engage in ritualised fights to maintain and resolve boundary disputes with neighbouring colonies. When individuals from separate colonies meet, they will engage each other until appeasement occurs. A meat ant detects a foreign worker by intense antennation and gaping of the mandibles, and will also stretch themselves upward to appear taller and larger, suggesting that meat ants do this in a display of size matching. Once the ants have finished fighting, they will groom themselves and search for another ant. Such disputes between colonies may continue for months or even years in the same area, and escalated fights that result in serious injury or death are rare.

=== Foraging ===
All species are predators and scavengers. Iridomyrmex ants tend to many Hemiptera insects and butterfly larvae to receive honeydew. Workers forage and scavenge for small insects, and they collect nectar from flowers and hunt for prey. Iridomyrmex ants normally forage on the ground, but most species will forage up into trees and vegetation to look for food. Most ants are diurnal foragers, but some are nocturnal. These nocturnal ants will sometimes become active during the day, but this depends on the suitability of the weather. They will also block their entrance holes when it is daytime; however, I. bigi is nocturnal and never comes out during the day. In a few species, a nest will not be placed in a shaded area; this is so it can warm up during the early mornings and workers can forage shortly after sunrise.

=== Diet ===
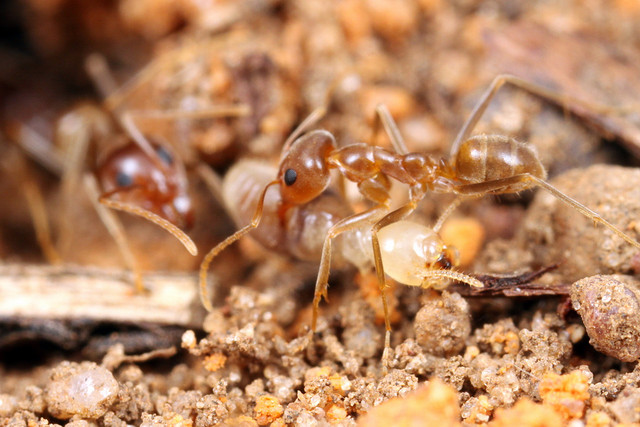
Iridomyrmex with a captured termite

Iridomyrmex primarily feeds on sweet foods such as nectar and honeydew. They hunt for insects and other ants to feed to their young, and workers are particularly attracted to seeds with elaiosomes. They collect these seeds, remove the elaiosomes, and then discard the seeds. The seedlings that sprout from these seeds benefit from proximity to the aggressive Iridomyrmex ants, giving them a better chance of survival. Colonies sometimes nest in termite mounds, and so the termites are regularly preyed on by Iridomyrmex; no evidence for any kind of relationship (other than a predatory one) is known. Juvenile cane toads are often preyed on, as certain Iridomyrmex species such as I. purpureus and I. ruburrus are immune to the toxins released by the cane toads. As a result, placing Iridomyrmex nests in habitats which house cane toads have been suggested as a method of controlling the cane toad population. The meat ant is the only known ant in Australia that feeds on guano.

=== Predators ===
Some invertebrate species specialise in predation of Iridomyrmex ants. One spider in particular, the cursorial spider Habronestes bradleyi, is a specialist predator against these ants and will use the alarm pheromones that are released by the ants during territorial disputes to locate them. The Australian thorny devil lizard (Moloch horridus) is a sit and wait predator that primarily preys on Iridomyrmex ants, and one lizard will reject specific species in this genus while eating others. The blind snake Ramphotyphlops nigrescens follows trails laid by these ants to locate them as a potential prey species and will eat the broods of some species, while ground beetles dig burrows near ant nests to prey on workers passing by.

A prominent predator is the short-beaked echidna (Tachyglossus aculeatus) that eats the virgin queens during nuptial flight due to their high percentage of fat. Echidnas do not consume Iridomyrmex ants all year; instead, they usually attack nests during August to October, which is when the winged females and males, known as alates emerge from their nest. Queens will also face more threats during nuptial flight or after; birds such as currawongs, magpies and ravens, attracted by recently excavated soil, will dig out nests shortly after the queens have founded their colonies. Parasitic flatworms in the class Cestoda are known to infect Iridomyrmex.

=== Life cycle and reproduction ===
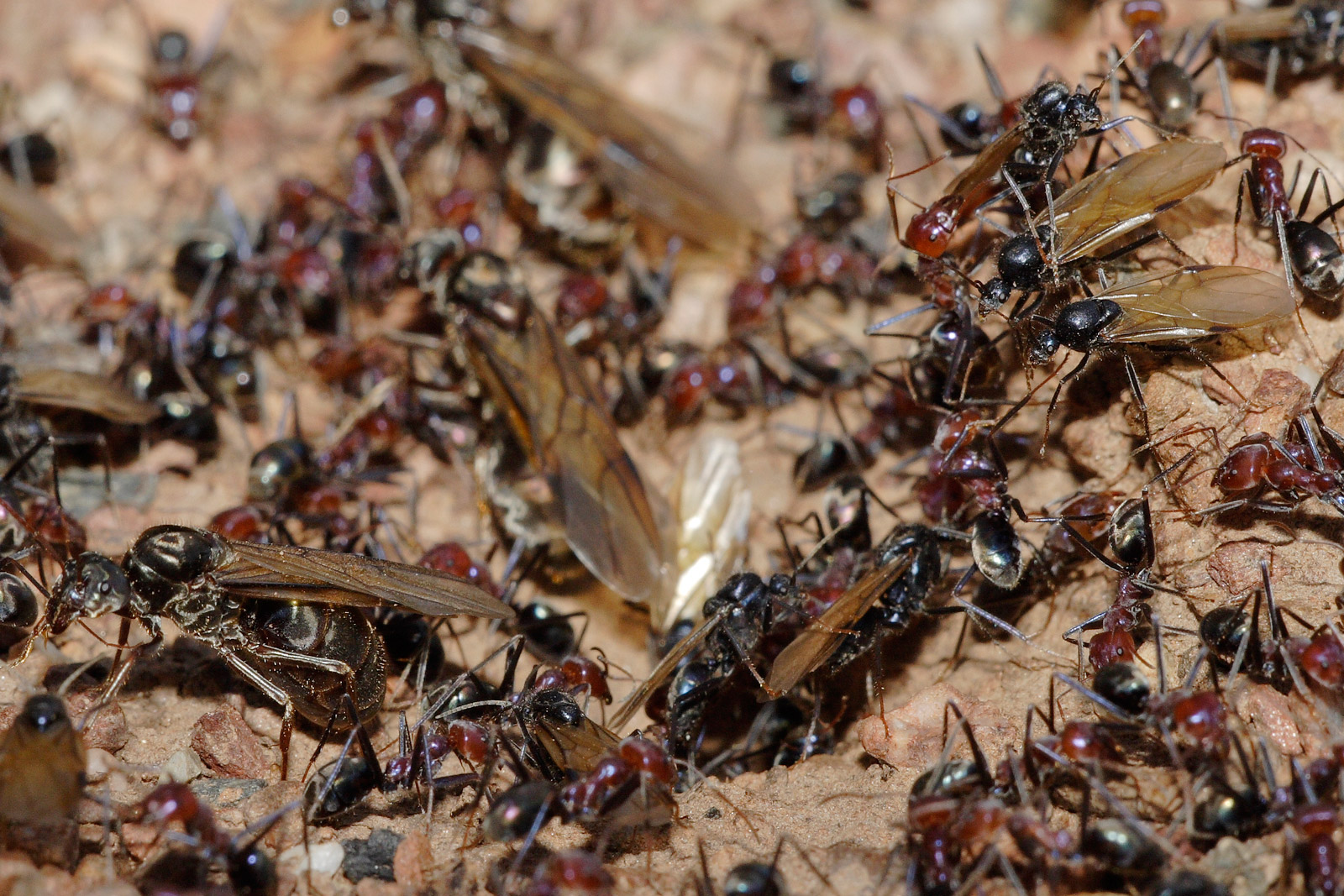
Meat eater ant nest during swarming

Nuptial flight occurs throughout the year in humid and warm climates. The alates begin to

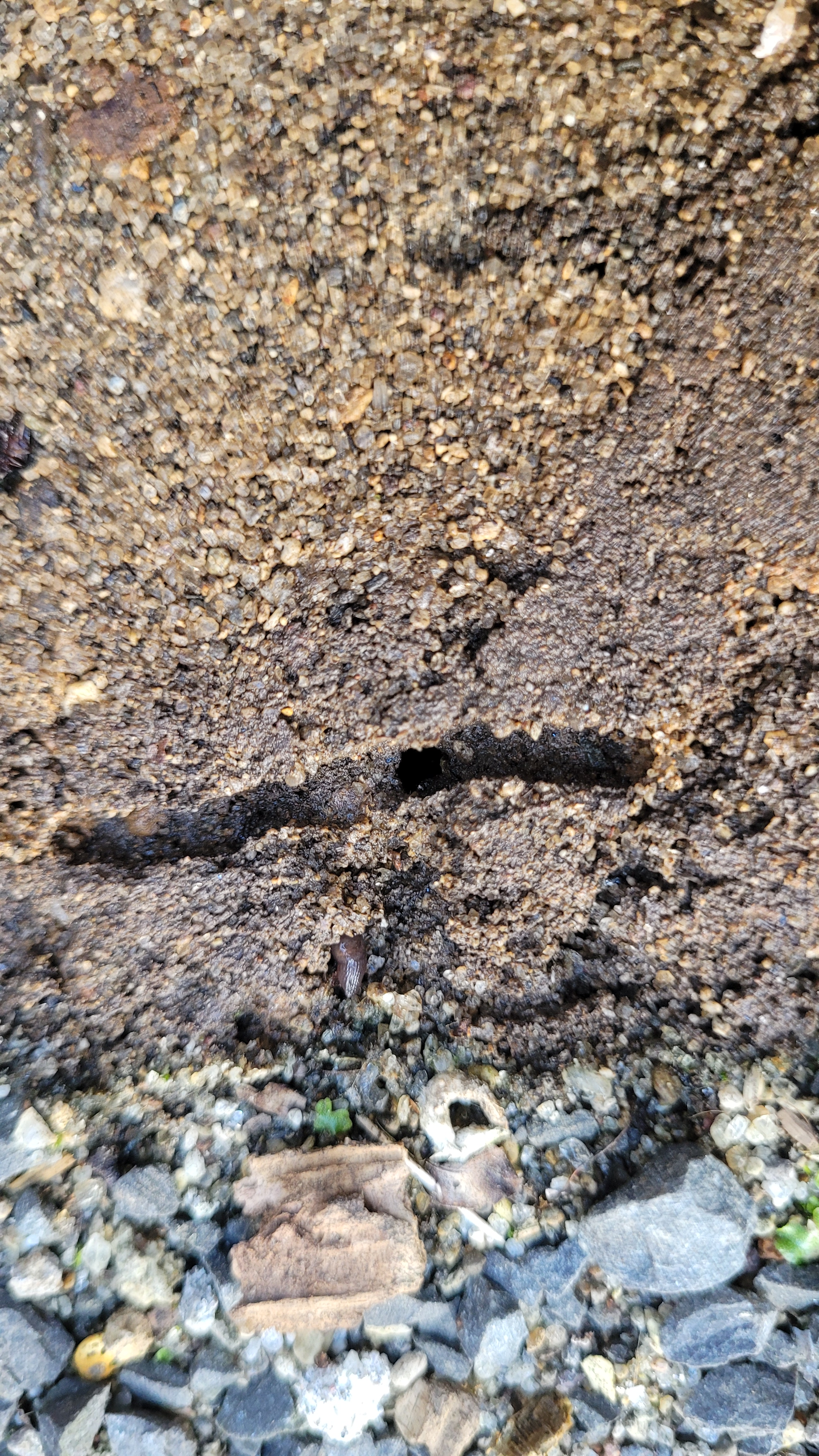
Iridomyrmex sp. queen founding chamber found under stone in New Zealand

emerge from their nest and immediately climb onto tall structures (such as tree trunks, fence-posts, or long flora) where they begin to fly and copulate. Depending on the species, a queen either mates with a single male or with multiple males. Observations show that meat ant males begin to fly first, followed by the queens. Groups of 20 to 40 queens will approach the top of the nest and fly once they are warm enough, and this would proceed multiple times for many days until the climate changes or all of the queens have withdrawn from the nest. After mating, the males soon die and the queens proceed to search for a suitable nest to establish her colony. Finding a location to nest is dangerous, as birds and other ants prey on them; disease and starvation are other causes of death in queens. While most queens will establish a nest by herself, nests can be established when queens cooperate with each other, are adopted into an existing colony, or by "budding" (also called "satelliting" or "fractionating"), where a subset of the colony including queens, workers and brood (eggs, larvae and pupae) leave the main colony for an alternative nest site. 10% of queens will cooperate with another queen during colony foundation.

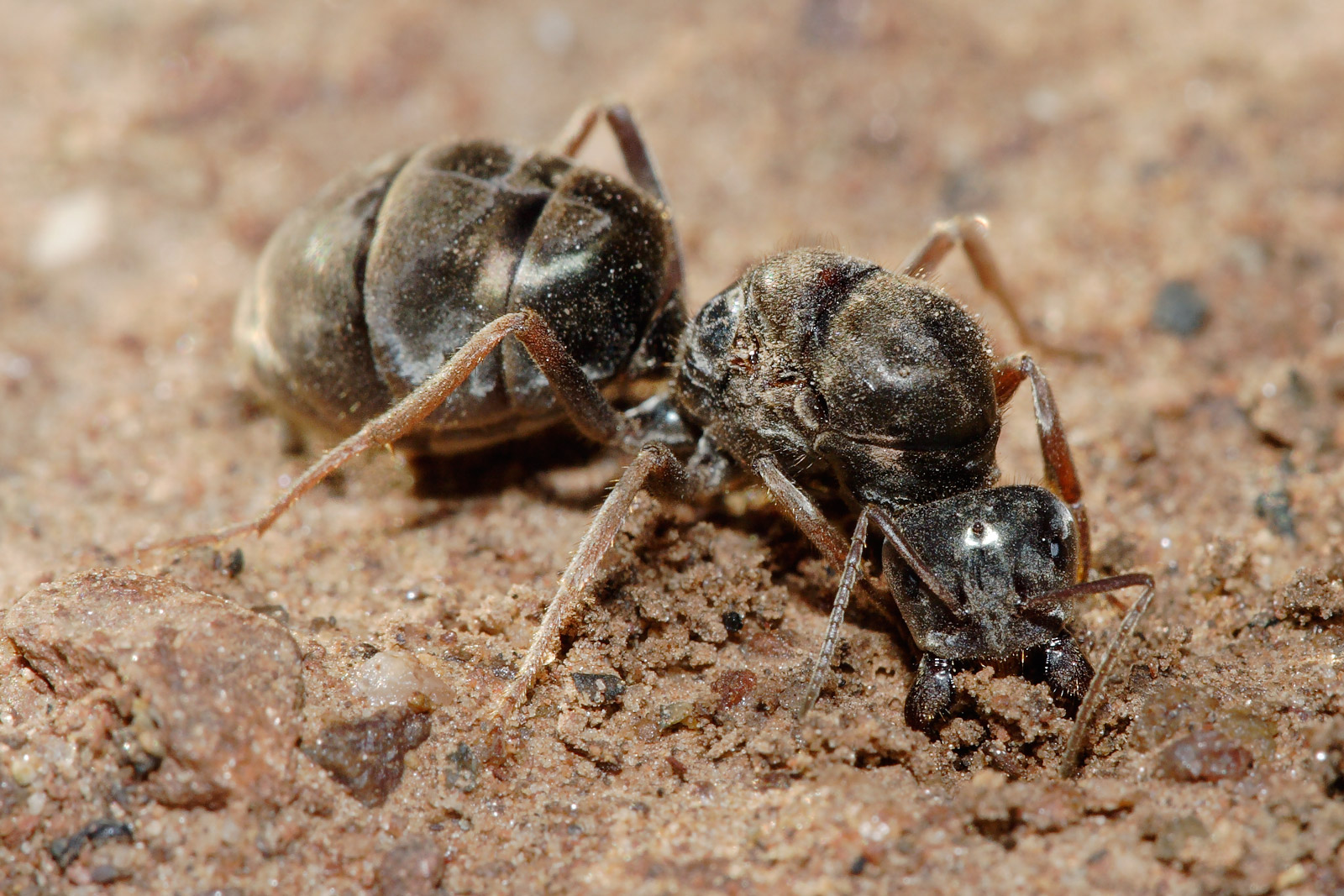
Fertilised meat-eater ant queen beginning to dig a new colony

Once a queen has excavated a chamber, she will lay around 20 eggs that develop into larvae in less than a month. These eggs take 44 to 61 days to fully develop and emerge as adults. Mature nests range in size, from a few hundred to over 300,000 workers. Most colonies are monogyne, meaning it only has a single queen, but some colonies can have as many as four. Oligogynous colonies also exist, in which multiple queens are present, but they are tolerated equally by workers birthed from different mothers and antagonism exists among queens. Brood discrimination is known based on recognition of kin, and queens will look after their own brood and neglect other brood laid by different queens. Queens display intolerance to each other when the first generation of workers is present, and the queens will separate from each other once the colony grows to a certain size.

== Symbiosis ==
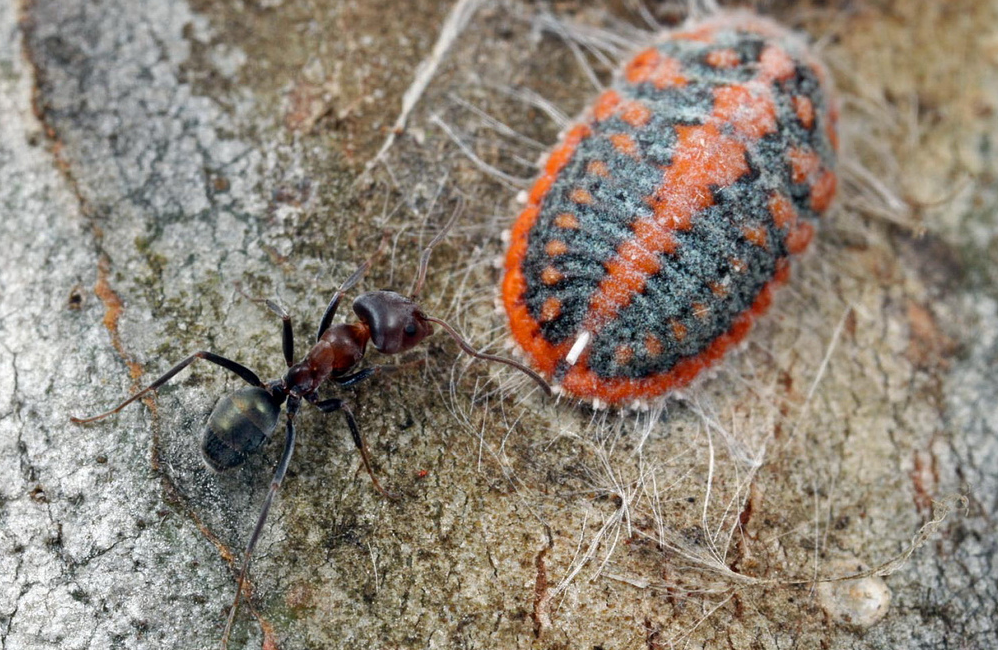
I. rufoniger worker tending to a scale insect

Iridomyrmex ants share symbiotic relationships with many caterpillars, aphids and coccids. Workers protect these caterpillars and will sometimes take them to their feeding chambers inside the nest. In the genus Jalmenus, workers attend to the butterflies Jalmenus clementi (turquoise hairstreak), Jalmenus daemeli (emerald hairstreak), Jalmenus eichhorni (northern hairstreak),Jalmenus evagoras (imperial hairstreak) Jalmenus icilius (amethyst hairstreak), Jalmenus inous (varied hairstreak) and Jalmenus lithochroa (Waterhouse's hairstreak). In the genus Ogyris, attendants include Ogyris amaryllis (satin azure), Ogyris olane (olane azure) and Ogyris oroetes (silky azure). Additional species workers attend include Anthene lycaenoides (pale ciliate blue), Candalides heathi (rayed blue), Candalides margarita (trident pencil-blue), Deudorix diovis (bright cornelian), Euchrysops cnejus (gram blue), Lampides boeticus (pea blue), Leptotes plinius (plumbago blue), Lucia limbaria (chequered copper), Nesolycaena caesia (Kimberly spotted opal), Neolucia agricola (fringed heath-blue) and Theclinesthes serpentata (saltbush blue). I. bicknelli is an effective pollinator of Microtis parviflora, and one study suggests the pollen is not harmed by contact of these ants.

Meat ants have been observed blocking banded sugar ant nesting holes with pebbles and soil to prevent them from leaving their nest during the early hours of the day. The ants counter this by preventing meat ants from leaving their nest by blocking their nesting holes with debris, a behaviour known as nest-plugging. If meat ant nests are encroached by trees or other shade, banded sugar ants may invade and take over the nest, since the health of the colony may deteriorate from overshadowing. Members of an affected meat ant colony later move to a nearby satellite nest that is placed in a suitable area, while invading banded sugar ants fill nest galleries up with a black resinous material.

== Interaction with humans ==
In rural Australia, meat ants are important to farmers as they place animal carcasses on their nests. In a matter of weeks, the entire carcass will be consumed and reduced to bones. However, Iridomyrmex ants are sometimes considered pests, due to these ants entering human houses to feed on food and soil disturbance. Eradication of nests can be difficult, as nests can be repopulated from a rival colony or adjoining nests which were not affected. Particular species have adapted rather well to urbanisation; during the early days in Canberra, newly constructed suburbs provided new nest sites for meat ants, and populations flourished. Other factors include plantations enriched with valuable food sources and home gardens. Workers also cause problems for those who are Citrus producers; they will affect the biological control of Hemiptera insects, specifically those who produce honeydew.

== See also ==
- List of ants of Australia
