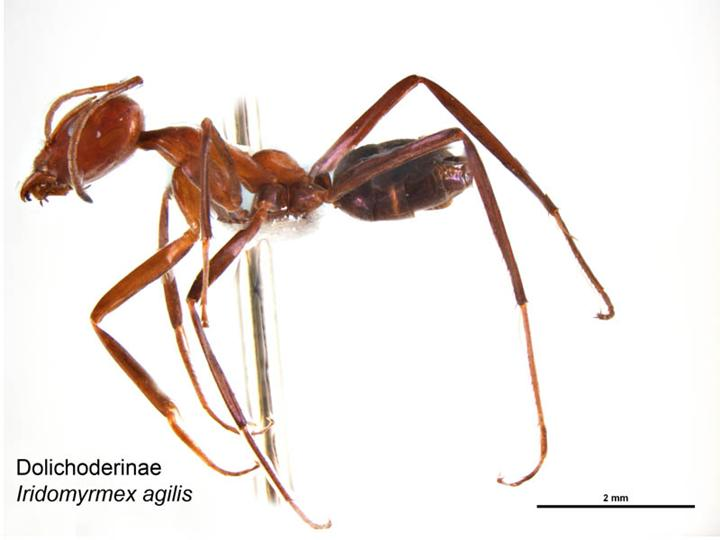

Scientific classification
- Kingdom: Animalia
- Phylum: Arthropoda
- Class: Insecta
- Order: Hymenoptera
- Family: Formicidae
- Subfamily: Dolichoderinae
- Genus: Iridomyrmex
- Species: I. agilis

Binomial name
- Iridomyrmex agilis Forel, 1907

= Iridomyrmex agilis =

Species of ant

Iridomyrmex agilis is an ant of the genus Iridomyrmex. They are distributed throughout most of Australia. They are usually found in the drier regions of Australia. The species was described by Auguste-Henri Forel in 1907.
