= Iridomyrmex viridigaster =

Scientific classification
- Kingdom: Animalia
- Phylum: Arthropoda
- Class: Insecta
- Order: Hymenoptera
- Family: Formicidae
- Subfamily: Dolichoderinae
- Genus: Iridomyrmex
- Species: I. viridigaster

Binomial name
- Iridomyrmex viridigaster Clark, 1941

Synonyms
- Iridomyrmex mimulus Shattuck, 1993

Species of ant

Iridomyrmex viridigaster is a species of ant in the genus Iridomyrmex. Endemic to Australia, though not very common, it was described by John S. Clark in 1941.
