= Iridomyrmex phillipensis =

Scientific classification
- Kingdom: Animalia
- Phylum: Arthropoda
- Clade: Pancrustacea
- Class: Insecta
- Order: Hymenoptera
- Family: Formicidae
- Subfamily: Dolichoderinae
- Genus: Iridomyrmex
- Species: I. phillipensis

Binomial name
- Iridomyrmex phillipensis Heterick & Shattuck, 2011

Species of ant

Iridomyrmex phillipensis is a species of ant in the genus Iridomyrmex. Described by Heterick and Shattuck in 2011, the ant is the only species endemic to Australia to not actually live in the country itself, but instead lives in territory that belongs to Australia.

== Etymology ==
The name of the ant is in reference to the location where the first specimens of the species were collected.
