= Iridomyrmex atypicus =

Scientific classification
- Kingdom: Animalia
- Phylum: Arthropoda
- Clade: Pancrustacea
- Class: Insecta
- Order: Hymenoptera
- Family: Formicidae
- Subfamily: Dolichoderinae
- Genus: Iridomyrmex
- Species: I. atypicus

Binomial name
- Iridomyrmex atypicus Heterick & Shattuck, 2011

Species of ant

Iridomyrmex atypicus is a species of ant of the genus Iridomyrmex. It was recently described by Heterick and Shattuck in 2011. Specimens recorded were only found in Lake Mere in New South Wales. They were only found in paddocks.

== Etymology ==
The ant has its name due to its distinctive nature of its appearance.
