= Iridomyrmex innocens =

Scientific classification
- Kingdom: Animalia
- Phylum: Arthropoda
- Class: Insecta
- Order: Hymenoptera
- Family: Formicidae
- Subfamily: Dolichoderinae
- Genus: Iridomyrmex
- Species: I. innocens

Binomial name
- Iridomyrmex innocens Forel, 1907

Synonyms
- Iridomyrmex argutus Shattuck, 1993; Iridomyrmex occiduus Shattuck, 1993

Species of ant

Iridomyrmex innocens is a species of ant in the genus Iridomyrmex. Described by Auguste-Henri Forel in 1907, the species is endemic to Australia, mainly confined in Western Australia, but the species is more common in areas with higher rainfalls within the Darling Ranges.
