= Iridomyrmex shandongicus =

†Iridomyrmex shandongicus Temporal range: Fossil

Scientific classification
- Domain: Eukaryota
- Kingdom: Animalia
- Phylum: Arthropoda
- Class: Insecta
- Order: Hymenoptera
- Family: Formicidae
- Subfamily: Dolichoderinae
- Genus: Iridomyrmex
- Species: I. shandongicus

Binomial name
- Iridomyrmex shandongicus Zhang, 1989

Species of ant

Iridomyrmex shandongicus is an extinct species of ant in the genus Iridomyrmex. Described by Zhang in 1989, fossils were originally found in 1989, and out of all the fossils in the genus, this one has strongest support that it belongs in the genus.
