= Iridomyrmex niger =

Scientific classification
- Kingdom: Animalia
- Phylum: Arthropoda
- Class: Insecta
- Order: Hymenoptera
- Family: Formicidae
- Subfamily: Dolichoderinae
- Genus: Iridomyrmex
- Species: I. niger

Binomial name
- Iridomyrmex niger Heterick & Shattuck, 2011

Species of ant

Iridomyrmex niger is a species of ant in the genus Iridomyrmex. Described by Heterick and Shattuck in 2011, the species is endemic to multiple states in Australia.

== Etymology ==
The name derives from the Latin language, which translates as 'black', which refers to its appearance of only being black.
