= Iridomyrmex fulgens =

Scientific classification
- Kingdom: Animalia
- Phylum: Arthropoda
- Class: Insecta
- Order: Hymenoptera
- Family: Formicidae
- Subfamily: Dolichoderinae
- Genus: Iridomyrmex
- Species: I. fulgens

Binomial name
- Iridomyrmex fulgens Heterick & Shattuck, 2011

Species of ant

Iridomyrmex fulgens is a species of ant in the genus Iridomyrmex. Described by Heterick and Shattuck in 2011, the species is found in several states in Australia, usually in the drier regions of the country.

== Etymology ==
The species name derives from the Latin language, and when translated, it means 'brilliant' or 'splendid', which refers to parts of the ants body, or in particular its brown foreparts presenting a shiny appearance.
