= Iridomyrmex cuneiceps =

Scientific classification
- Kingdom: Animalia
- Phylum: Arthropoda
- Class: Insecta
- Order: Hymenoptera
- Family: Formicidae
- Subfamily: Dolichoderinae
- Genus: Iridomyrmex
- Species: I. cuneiceps

Binomial name
- Iridomyrmex cuneiceps Heterick & Shattuck, 2011

Species of ant

Iridomyrmex cuneiceps is a species of ant in the genus Iridomyrmex, endemic to Australia, typically seen in northern inland regions of Western Australia and some remote areas in the Northern Territory. Described in 2011, the ant is medium in size.

== Etymology ==
Its name from Latin translates to wedge head ( 'cuneus' — 'wedge and 'ceps', derivative of 'caput, meaning head).
