= Iridomyrmex gumnos =

Scientific classification
- Kingdom: Animalia
- Phylum: Arthropoda
- Class: Insecta
- Order: Hymenoptera
- Family: Formicidae
- Subfamily: Dolichoderinae
- Genus: Iridomyrmex
- Species: I. gumnos

Binomial name
- Iridomyrmex gumnos Heterick & Shattuck, 2011

Species of ant

Iridomyrmex gumnos is a species of ant in the genus Iridomyrmex. Described by Heterick and Shattuck in 2011, the biology of the ant remains unknown, but it is distributed in South Australia and New South Wales.

== Etymology ==
The specific epithet (gumnos) is said to be Latin for nude. In classical Latin, the proper word for "nude" is nudus. The ancient Greek word for "nude" is however gumnos (γυμνός).
