= Iridomyrmex mirabilis =

Scientific classification
- Kingdom: Animalia
- Phylum: Arthropoda
- Class: Insecta
- Order: Hymenoptera
- Family: Formicidae
- Subfamily: Dolichoderinae
- Genus: Iridomyrmex
- Species: I. mirabilis

Binomial name
- Iridomyrmex mirabilis Heterick & Shattuck, 2011

Species of ant

Iridomyrmex mirabilis is a species of ant in the genus Iridomyrmex. Described by Heterick and Shattuck in 2011, the ant is endemic to Australia.

== Etymology ==
The name derives from the Latin language, which translates as 'wonderful', which is in reference to how unique the species looks in comparison to other Iridomyrmex ants.
