= Iridomyrmex xanthocoxa =

Scientific classification
- Kingdom: Animalia
- Phylum: Arthropoda
- Class: Insecta
- Order: Hymenoptera
- Family: Formicidae
- Subfamily: Dolichoderinae
- Genus: Iridomyrmex
- Species: I. xanthocoxa

Binomial name
- Iridomyrmex xanthocoxa Heterick & Shattuck, 2011

Species of ant

Iridomyrmex xanthocoxa is a species of ant in the genus Iridomyrmex. Described in 2011, the ant is mainly confined to the Pilbara region of Western Australia.

== Etymology ==
Its name deprives from the Greek language, and translate as: ‘xanthos’—‘ yellow’ plus ‘coxa’, which references the colour appearance on the species.
