= Iridomyrmex meridianus =

Scientific classification
- Kingdom: Animalia
- Phylum: Arthropoda
- Clade: Pancrustacea
- Class: Insecta
- Order: Hymenoptera
- Family: Formicidae
- Subfamily: Dolichoderinae
- Genus: Iridomyrmex
- Species: I. meridianus

Binomial name
- Iridomyrmex meridianus Heterick & Shattuck, 2011

Species of ant

Iridomyrmex meridianus is a species of ant in the genus Iridomyrmex, described by Heterick and Shattuck in 2011. The species is endemic to Australia, and nests are commonly found under rocks, logs and rotting wood in forested areas, and they are known to be living in southern areas of Australian states like Western Australia and Tasmania.

== Etymology ==
The name derives from the Latin language, which refers to its presence usually being southern.
