= Iridomyrmex neocaledonica =

Scientific classification
- Domain: Eukaryota
- Kingdom: Animalia
- Phylum: Arthropoda
- Class: Insecta
- Order: Hymenoptera
- Family: Formicidae
- Subfamily: Dolichoderinae
- Genus: Iridomyrmex
- Species: I. neocaledonica

Binomial name
- Iridomyrmex neocaledonica Heterick & Shattuck, 2011

Species of ant

Iridomyrmex neocaledonica is a species of ant in the genus Iridomyrmex. Described by Heterick and Shattuck in 2011 and unlike most Iridomyrmex ants, the ant is endemic to New Caledonia.

== Etymology ==
The name derives from Latin, which refers to its distribution (New Caledonia).
