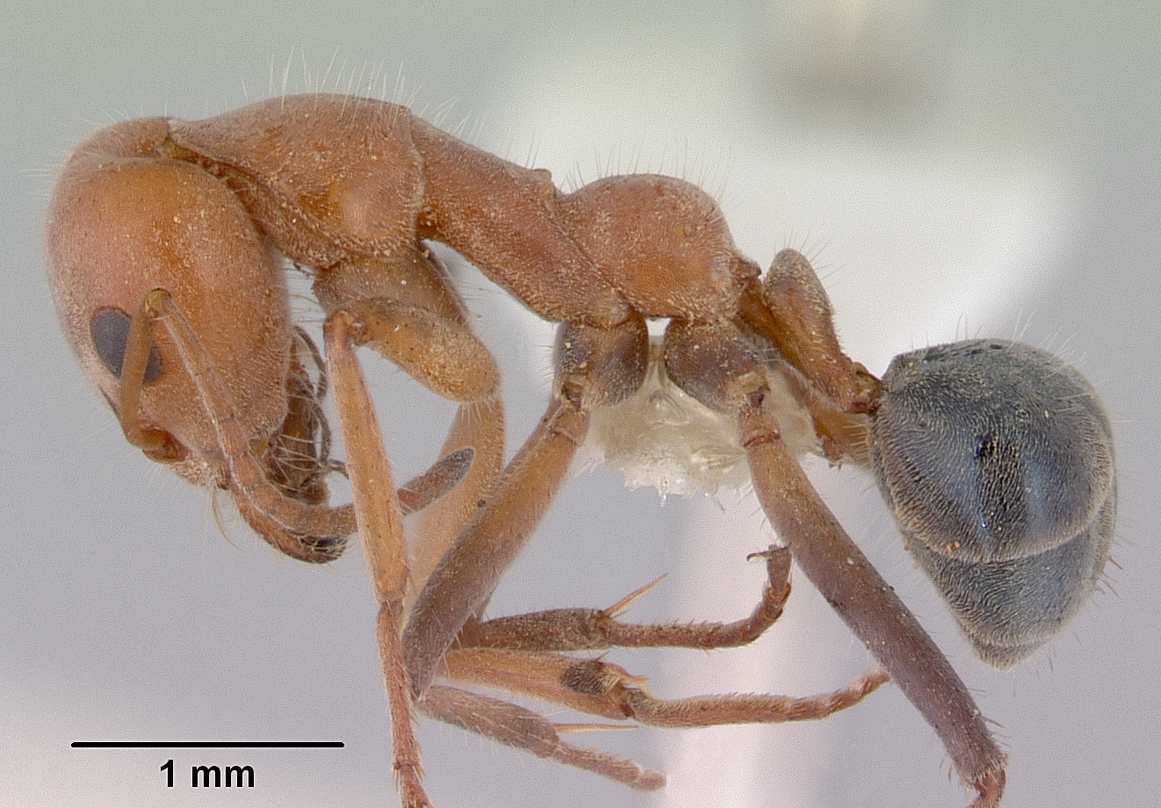

Scientific classification
- Kingdom: Animalia
- Phylum: Arthropoda
- Clade: Pancrustacea
- Class: Insecta
- Order: Hymenoptera
- Family: Formicidae
- Subfamily: Dolichoderinae
- Genus: Iridomyrmex
- Species: I. rufoinclinus

Binomial name
- Iridomyrmex rufoinclinus Shattuck, 1993

= Iridomyrmex rufoinclinus =

Species of ant

Iridomyrmex rufoinclinus is a species of ant in the genus Iridomyrmex. Described by Shattuck in 1993, the species is a common ant in the northern regions of Australia in woodland-like habitats, and nests can be found on loose soils.
