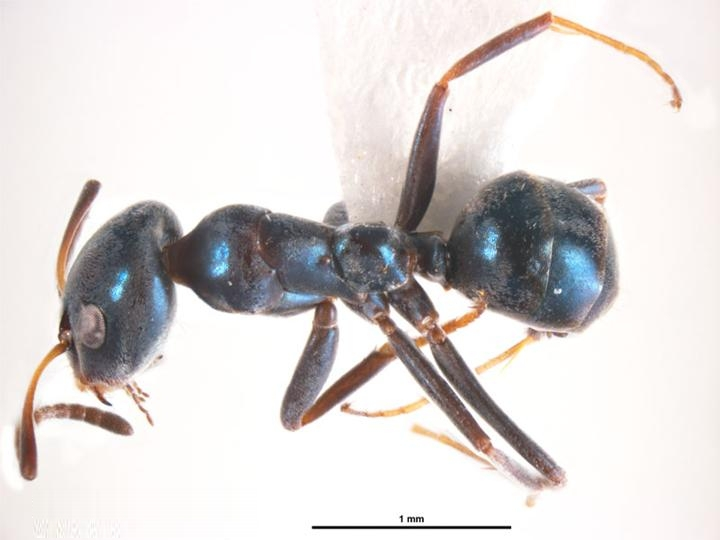

Scientific classification
- Kingdom: Animalia
- Phylum: Arthropoda
- Class: Insecta
- Order: Hymenoptera
- Family: Formicidae
- Subfamily: Dolichoderinae
- Genus: Iridomyrmex
- Species: I. coeruleus

Binomial name
- Iridomyrmex coeruleus Heterick & Shattuck, 2011

= Iridomyrmex coeruleus =

Species of ant

Iridomyrmex coeruleus is a species of ant in the genus Iridomyrmex. Described in 2011, these ants are endemic to Australia and New Guinea.
