= Iridomyrmex suchieroides =

Scientific classification
- Kingdom: Animalia
- Phylum: Arthropoda
- Class: Insecta
- Order: Hymenoptera
- Family: Formicidae
- Subfamily: Dolichoderinae
- Genus: Iridomyrmex
- Species: I. suchieroides

Binomial name
- Iridomyrmex suchieroides Heterick & Shattuck, 2011

Species of ant

Iridomyrmex suchieroides is a species of ant in the genus Iridomyrmex. The ant was described by Heterick and Shattuck in 2011, and is endemic to almost all of Australia except for Tasmania.

== Etymology ==
The name derives from the Greek Language, which oides translates to 'like', plus suchieri.
