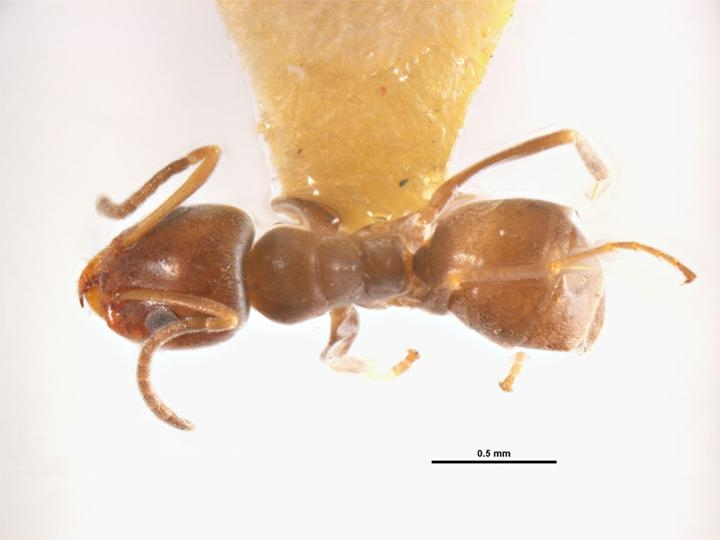

Scientific classification
- Kingdom: Animalia
- Phylum: Arthropoda
- Class: Insecta
- Order: Hymenoptera
- Family: Formicidae
- Subfamily: Dolichoderinae
- Genus: Iridomyrmex
- Species: I. mjobergi

Binomial name
- Iridomyrmex mjobergi Forel, 1915

= Iridomyrmex mjobergi =

Species of ant

Iridomyrmex mjobergi is a species of ant in the genus Iridomyrmex. Described by Auguste-Henri Forel in 1915, the species is among the most common of the genus, endemic to all states and territories in Australia, and even extends into New Guinea. Workers are not usually aggressive, and they have been observed foraging for foods like nectar and honeydew.
