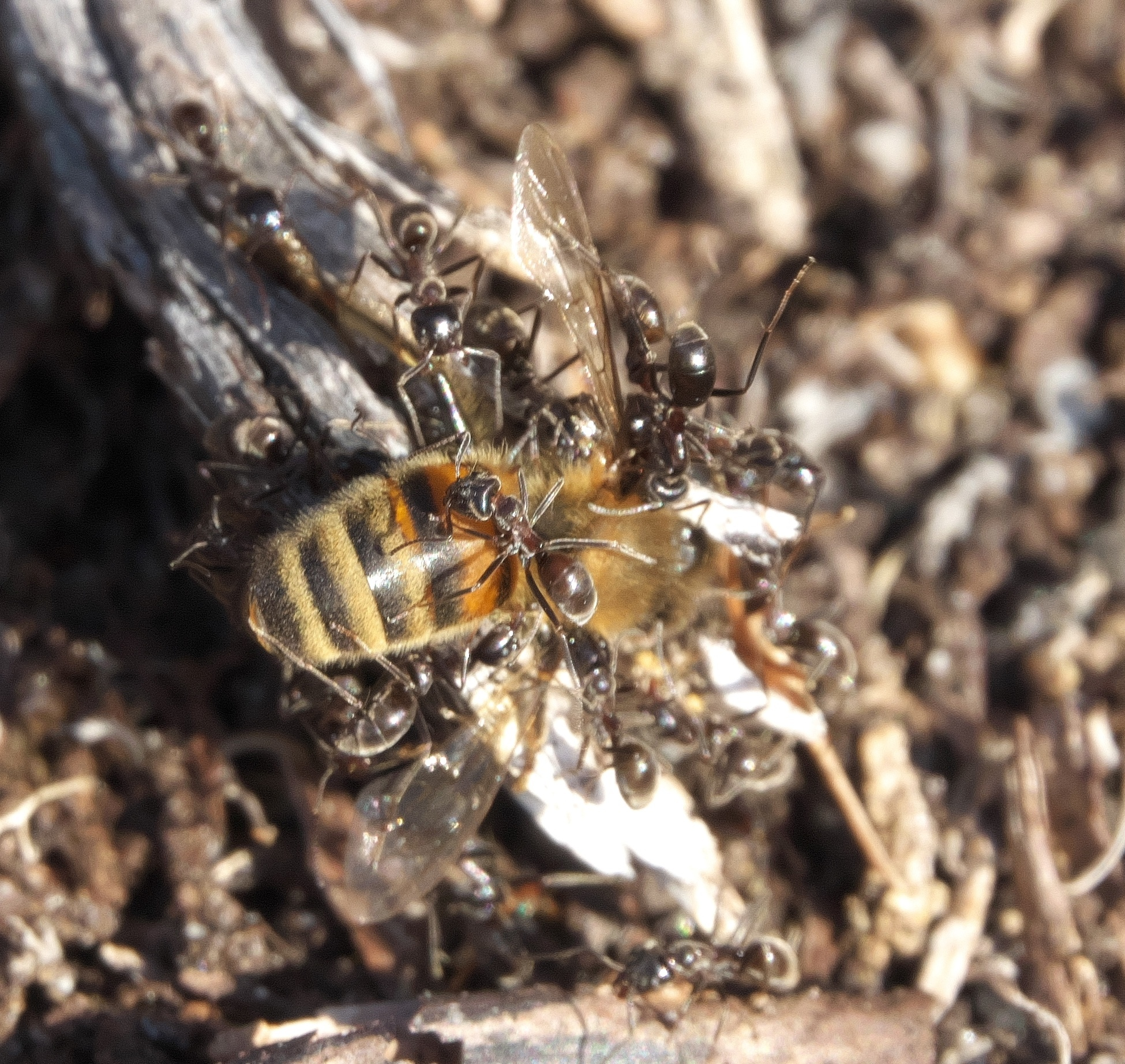
- Iridomyrmex turbineus, Australia

Scientific classification
- Kingdom: Animalia
- Phylum: Arthropoda
- Class: Insecta
- Order: Hymenoptera
- Family: Formicidae
- Subfamily: Dolichoderinae
- Genus: Iridomyrmex
- Species: I. turbineus

Binomial name
- Iridomyrmex turbineus Shattuck & McMillan, 1998

= Iridomyrmex turbineus =

Species of ant

Iridomyrmex turbineus is a species of ant in the genus Iridomyrmex. Described by Shattuck and McMillan in 1998, the species is endemic to Australia, commonly seen on the coasts of Western Australia.
