= Iridomyrmex spurcus =

Scientific classification
- Kingdom: Animalia
- Phylum: Arthropoda
- Class: Insecta
- Order: Hymenoptera
- Family: Formicidae
- Subfamily: Dolichoderinae
- Genus: Iridomyrmex
- Species: I. spurcus

Binomial name
- Iridomyrmex spurcus Wheeler, W.M., 1915

Species of ant

Iridomyrmex spurcus is a species of ant in the genus Iridomyrmex. Described by William Morton Wheeler in 1915, the ant has a large extensive distribution in Australia.
