= Iridomyrmex omalonotus =

Scientific classification
- Kingdom: Animalia
- Phylum: Arthropoda
- Class: Insecta
- Order: Hymenoptera
- Family: Formicidae
- Subfamily: Dolichoderinae
- Genus: Iridomyrmex
- Species: I. omalonotus

Binomial name
- Iridomyrmex omalonotus Heterick & Shattuck, 2011

Species of ant

Iridomyrmex omalonotus is a species of ant in the genus Iridomyrmex. Described by Heterick and Shattuck in 2011, the ant is endemic to Australia, and the ants are known for its attraction to honey, and attends to lycaenid caterpillars and other Hemiptera that produces honey.

== Etymology ==
The name is said to be derived from Greek omalus, 'flat' and Latin notus, 'back', in reference to the appearance of a worker's propodeum. The proper ancient Greek word for "flat" is however homalos (ὁμαλός) or homalēs (ὁμαλής).
