= Iridomyrmex pallidus =

Scientific classification
- Kingdom: Animalia
- Phylum: Arthropoda
- Class: Insecta
- Order: Hymenoptera
- Family: Formicidae
- Subfamily: Dolichoderinae
- Genus: Iridomyrmex
- Species: I. pallidus

Binomial name
- Iridomyrmex pallidus Forel, 1901

Synonyms
- Iridomyrmex rufoniger incertus Forel, 1902; Iridomyrmex wingi Donisthorpe, 1949

Species of ant

Iridomyrmex pallidus is a species of ant in the genus Iridomyrmex. Described by Auguste-Henri Forel in 1901, the ant is endemic to Australia, New Guinea and the Solomon Islands, and their preferred habitats include tropical rainforests and eucalypt forest.
