= Iridomyrmex infuscus =

Scientific classification
- Kingdom: Animalia
- Phylum: Arthropoda
- Class: Insecta
- Order: Hymenoptera
- Family: Formicidae
- Subfamily: Dolichoderinae
- Genus: Iridomyrmex
- Species: I. infuscus

Binomial name
- Iridomyrmex infuscus Heterick & Shattuck, 2011

Species of ant

Iridomyrmex infuscus is a species of ant in the genus Iridomyrmex. Described by Heterick and Shattuck in 2011, the species is known only from a single specimen collected in the Australian Capital Territory.

== Etymology ==
The species name derives from the Latin language, which translates as 'dark brown' or 'blackish', in reference to the species appearance.
