= Iridomyrmex brennani =

Scientific classification
- Kingdom: Animalia
- Phylum: Arthropoda
- Class: Insecta
- Order: Hymenoptera
- Family: Formicidae
- Subfamily: Dolichoderinae
- Genus: Iridomyrmex
- Species: I. brennani

Binomial name
- Iridomyrmex brennani Heterick & Shattuck, 2011

Species of ant

Iridomyrmex brennani is a species of ant in the genus Iridomyrmex. Described recently in 2011, specimens were collected from Victoria, South Australia and Western Australia in the Kambalda district.

== Etymology ==
The species is named after Dr. Karl Brennan, who collected specimens in the Kambalda District where the species was found.
