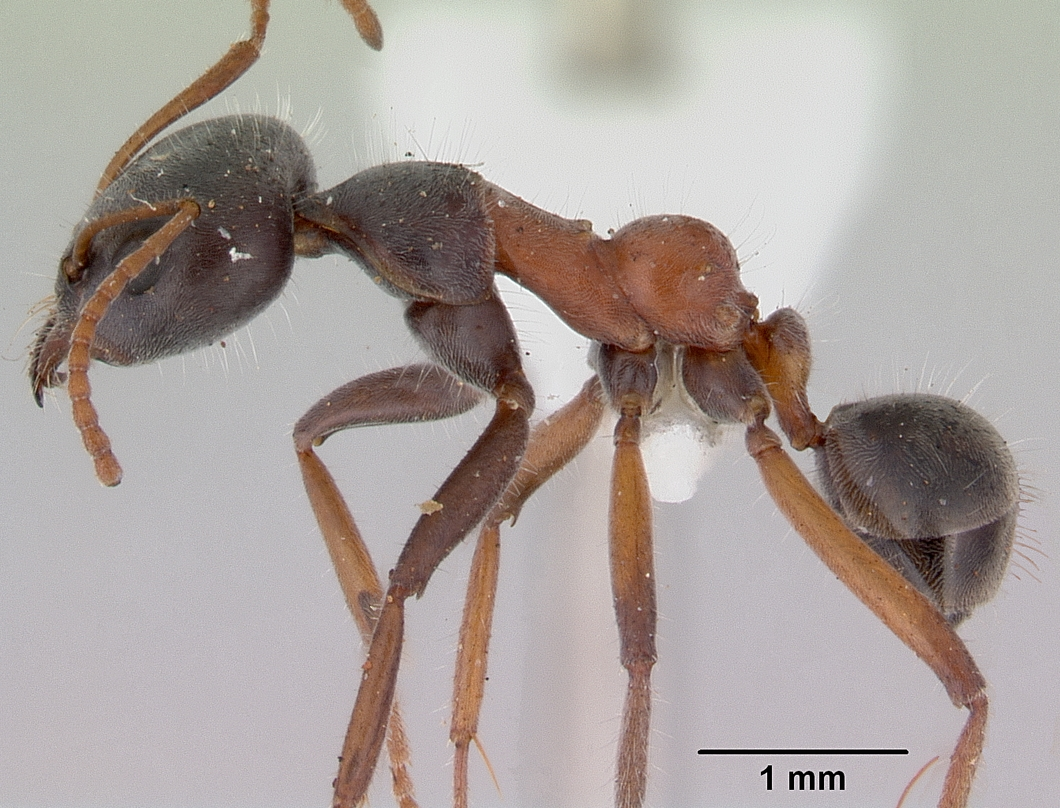

Scientific classification
- Kingdom: Animalia
- Phylum: Arthropoda
- Class: Insecta
- Order: Hymenoptera
- Family: Formicidae
- Subfamily: Dolichoderinae
- Genus: Iridomyrmex
- Species: I. anteroinclinus

Binomial name
- Iridomyrmex anteroinclinus Shattuck, 1993

= Iridomyrmex anteroinclinus =

Species of ant

Iridomyrmex anteroinclinus is a species of ant belonging to the genus Iridomyrmex. Described in 1993 by Shattuck, the Iridomyrmex anteroinclinus is native to Australia and has only been observed in Western Australia.
