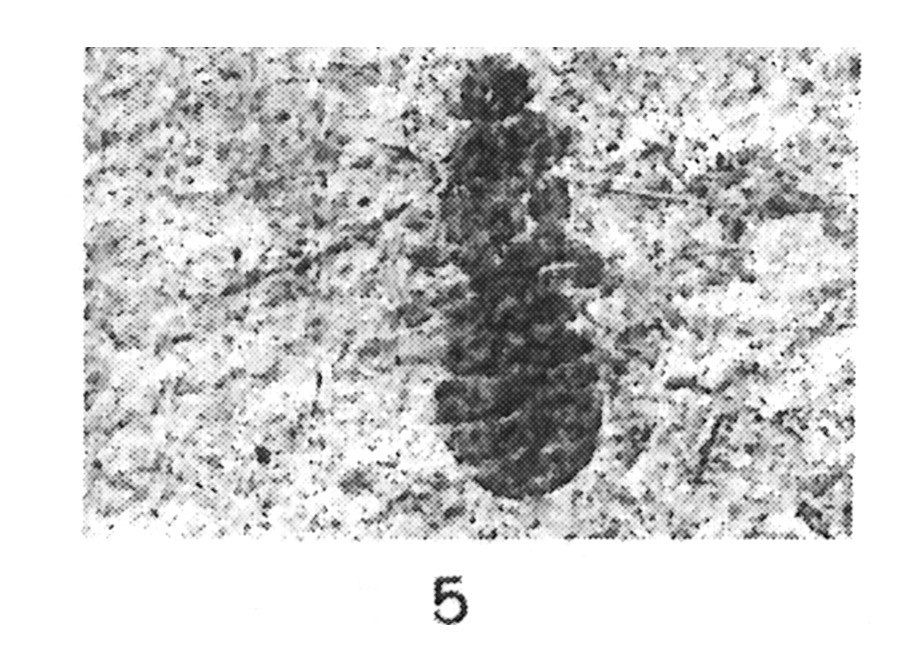

Scientific classification
- Kingdom: Animalia
- Phylum: Arthropoda
- Class: Insecta
- Order: Hymenoptera
- Family: Formicidae
- Subfamily: Dolichoderinae
- Genus: Iridomyrmex
- Species: †I. breviantennis

Binomial name
- †Iridomyrmex breviantennis Théobald, 1937

= Iridomyrmex breviantennis =

Iridomyrmex breviantennis Temporal range: Lutetian

Species of ant

Irdomyrmex breviantennis is an extinct species of ant which belongs to the genus Iridomyrmex. The first fossils was officially described by Théobald in 1937. A fossil of a queen was observed from Kleinkems in Efringen-Kirchen in Bade-Wurtemberg.
