= Iridomyrmex curvifrons =

Scientific classification
- Kingdom: Animalia
- Phylum: Arthropoda
- Class: Insecta
- Order: Hymenoptera
- Family: Formicidae
- Subfamily: Dolichoderinae
- Genus: Iridomyrmex
- Species: I. curvifrons

Binomial name
- Iridomyrmex curvifrons Heterick & Shattuck, 2011

Species of ant

Iridomyrmex curvifrons is a species of ant in the genus Iridomyrmex. Described in 2011, all known specimens have been collected in south-east Queensland.
