= Iridomyrmex angusticeps =

Scientific classification
- Kingdom: Animalia
- Phylum: Arthropoda
- Class: Insecta
- Order: Hymenoptera
- Family: Formicidae
- Subfamily: Dolichoderinae
- Genus: Iridomyrmex
- Species: I. angusticeps

Binomial name
- Iridomyrmex angusticeps Forel, 1901

Species of ant

Iridomyrmex angusticeps is an ant of the genus Iridomyrmex. Described by Auguste-Henri Forel in 1901, the species is distributed in Australia, and also elsewhere in Papua New Guinea and the Philippines. Two pins of the Iridomyrmex angusticeps in the Australian National Insect Collection were collected on the island of Mindanao in the Philippines.
