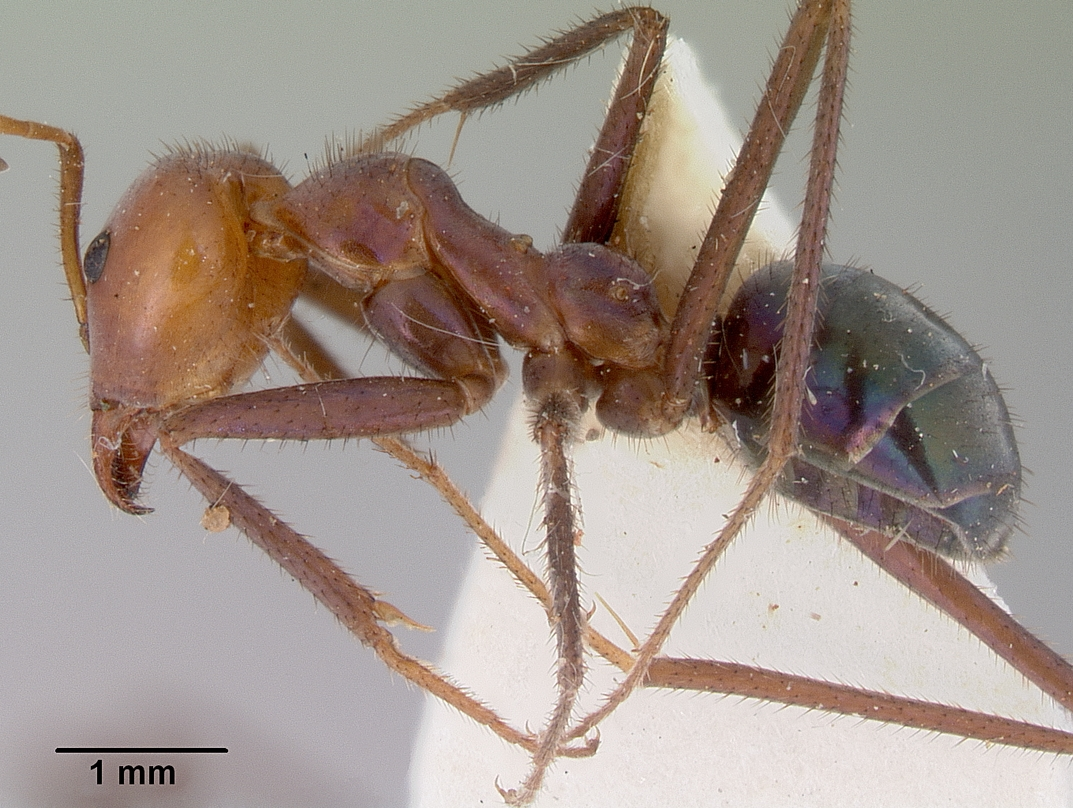

Scientific classification
- Kingdom: Animalia
- Phylum: Arthropoda
- Class: Insecta
- Order: Hymenoptera
- Family: Formicidae
- Subfamily: Dolichoderinae
- Genus: Iridomyrmex
- Species: I. galbanus

Binomial name
- Iridomyrmex galbanus Shattuck, 1993

= Iridomyrmex galbanus =

Species of ant insect

Iridomyrmex galbanus is a species of ant in the genus Iridomyrmex. Described by Shattuck in 1993, the ant is mainly confined to the Eyre peninsula in South Australia, but other populations of the species have been identified in several other states in Australia.

A journal article shows that the species favours particular types of soil.
