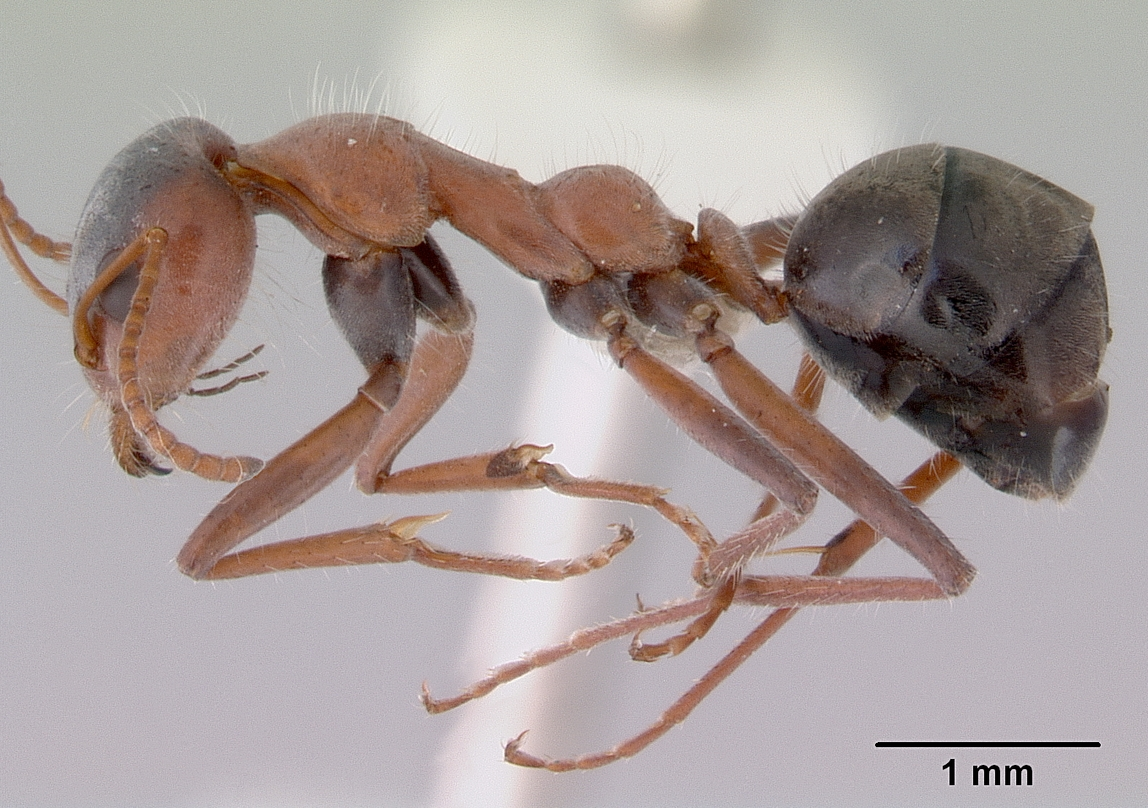

Scientific classification
- Kingdom: Animalia
- Phylum: Arthropoda
- Class: Insecta
- Order: Hymenoptera
- Family: Formicidae
- Subfamily: Dolichoderinae
- Genus: Iridomyrmex
- Species: I. cappoinclinus

Binomial name
- Iridomyrmex cappoinclinus Shattuck, 1993

= Iridomyrmex cappoinclinus =

Species of ant

Iridomyrmex cappoinclinus is a species of ant belonging to the genus Iridomyrmex. Native to Australia, they have been mainly studied and observed in the Northern Territory. It was first described by Shattuck back in 1993.
