= Iridomyrmex azureus =

Scientific classification
- Kingdom: Animalia
- Phylum: Arthropoda
- Class: Insecta
- Order: Hymenoptera
- Family: Formicidae
- Subfamily: Dolichoderinae
- Genus: Iridomyrmex
- Species: I. azureus

Binomial name
- Iridomyrmex azureus Viehmeyer, 1914

Species of ant

Iridomyrmex azureus is a species of ant in the genus Iridomyrmex. Described by Viehmeyer in 1914, specimens collected have been found in dry habitats in Western Australia and South Australia, and also in New South Wales and the Northern Territory.
