= Iridomyrmex mayri =

Scientific classification
- Kingdom: Animalia
- Phylum: Arthropoda
- Class: Insecta
- Order: Hymenoptera
- Family: Formicidae
- Subfamily: Dolichoderinae
- Genus: Iridomyrmex
- Species: I. mayri

Binomial name
- Iridomyrmex mayri Forel, 1915

Species of ant

Iridomyrmex mayri is a species of ant in the genus Iridomyrmex. Described by Auguste-Henri Forel in 1915, the species is endemic to Australia, these ants commonly nests under stones and rotting logs, and forage on tree trunks. The species also tends to larvae of Jalmenus evagoras butterflies.
