= Iridomyrmex trigonoceps =

Scientific classification
- Kingdom: Animalia
- Phylum: Arthropoda
- Class: Insecta
- Order: Hymenoptera
- Family: Formicidae
- Subfamily: Dolichoderinae
- Genus: Iridomyrmex
- Species: I. trigonoceps

Binomial name
- Iridomyrmex trigonoceps Heterick & Shattuck, 2011

Species of ant

Iridomyrmex trigonoceps is a species of ant in the genus Iridomyrmex. Described by Heterick and Shattuck in 2011, the species is broadly distributed in Western Australia, South Australia and the Northern Territory, but the species is relatively uncommon.

== Etymology ==
The name is said to be derived from Greek trigon, 'triangular' and Latin caput, 'head', and is in reference to its triangular head. The proper ancient Greek word for "triangular" is however trigōnos (τρίγωνος).
