= Iridomyrmex adstringatus =

Scientific classification
- Kingdom: Animalia
- Phylum: Arthropoda
- Class: Insecta
- Order: Hymenoptera
- Family: Formicidae
- Subfamily: Dolichoderinae
- Genus: Iridomyrmex
- Species: I. adstringatus

Binomial name
- Iridomyrmex adstringatus Heterick & Shattuck, 2011

Species of ant

Iridomyrmex adstringatus is a species of ant of the genus Iridomyrmex. Recently described in 2011 by Heterick & Shattuck, the species is rare to find, as specimens of this species have only been collected in South Australia. The first specimens collected were from the Coorong National Park.

== Etymology ==
In Latin, adstringatus is translated to "compressed" or "drawn together", which is in reference to the appearance of Iridomyrmex adstringatus ants.
