= Iridomyrmex longisoma =

Scientific classification
- Kingdom: Animalia
- Phylum: Arthropoda
- Class: Insecta
- Order: Hymenoptera
- Family: Formicidae
- Subfamily: Dolichoderinae
- Genus: Iridomyrmex
- Species: I. longisoma

Binomial name
- Iridomyrmex longisoma Heterick & Shattuck, 2011

Species of ant

Iridomyrmex longisoma is a species of ant in the genus Iridomyrmex. Described by Heterick and Shattuck in 2011, the ant is endemic to Australia, confined in Western Australia, and nests are known to inhabit into sandy soil.

== Etymology ==
The species name derives from the Latin language and the Greek language which translates to 'long' (longus) in Latin and in Greek: 'body' (soma).
