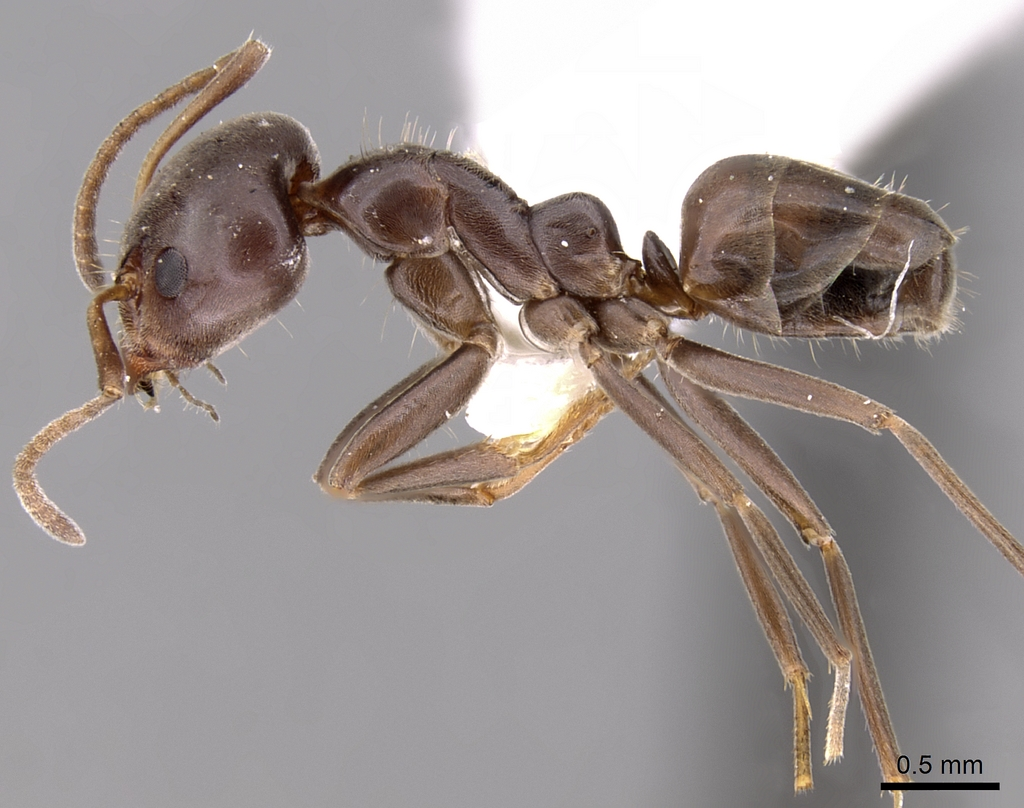
- Iridomyrmex alpinus worker

Scientific classification
- Kingdom: Animalia
- Phylum: Arthropoda
- Clade: Pancrustacea
- Class: Insecta
- Order: Hymenoptera
- Family: Formicidae
- Subfamily: Dolichoderinae
- Genus: Iridomyrmex
- Species: I. alpinus

Binomial name
- Iridomyrmex alpinus Heterick & Shattuck, 2011

= Iridomyrmex alpinus =

Species of ant

Iridomyrmex alpinus is a species of ant of the genus Iridomyrmex. It was described by Heterick and Shattuck in 2011.

== Distribution ==
The ant is found in wet areas in New South Wales, Victoria and Tasmania. Specimens were found in alpine areas, alpine heath, grassland and in Sclerophyll, either wet or dry, at elevations of 2,000 metres. These ants can establish nests under large stones, rotting wood, under dead piles of leaves and twigs, and workers have been found foraging in litter and alpine vegetation. A large number of specimens have been collected to the Australian National Insect Collection. A study this species is important for ants living in the eastern seaboard.

== Etymology ==
The Latin word alpinus translates as alpine, which refers to the habitat the ant lives in.
