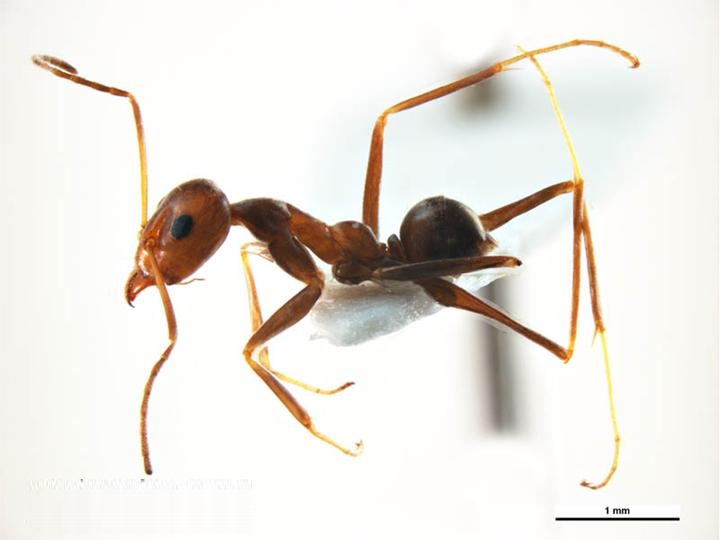

Scientific classification
- Kingdom: Animalia
- Phylum: Arthropoda
- Class: Insecta
- Order: Hymenoptera
- Family: Formicidae
- Subfamily: Dolichoderinae
- Genus: Iridomyrmex
- Species: I. minor

Binomial name
- Iridomyrmex minor Forel, 1915

= Iridomyrmex minor =

Species of ant

Iridomyrmex minor is a species of ant in the genus Iridomyrmex. Described by Auguste-Henri Forel in 1915, the ant is common in Western Australia, South Australia, Northern Territory and Queensland, and it is unlikely there are existing colonies in more southern Australian states. Nests have been found under bark, and is among the most likely ant to be encountered by the general public.
