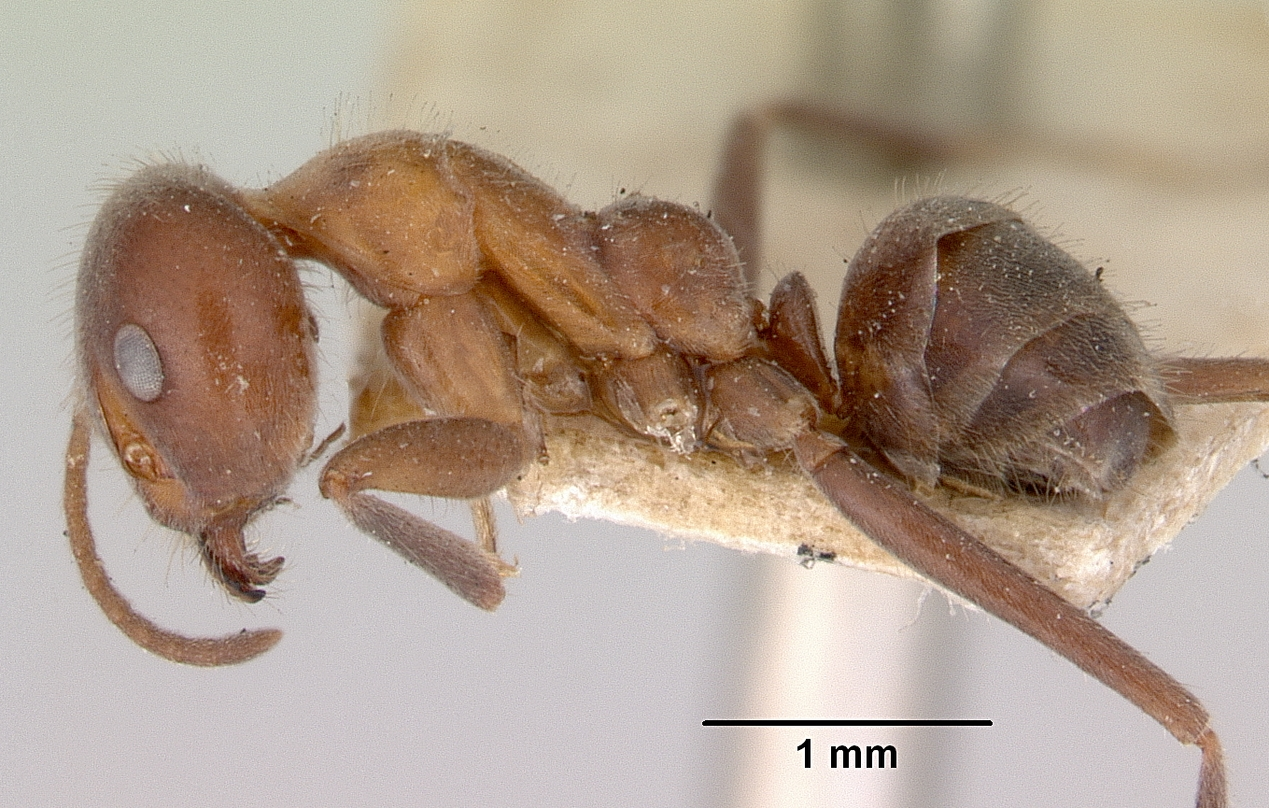

Scientific classification
- Kingdom: Animalia
- Phylum: Arthropoda
- Class: Insecta
- Order: Hymenoptera
- Family: Formicidae
- Subfamily: Dolichoderinae
- Genus: Iridomyrmex
- Species: I. obscurior

Binomial name
- Iridomyrmex obscurior Forel, 1902

= Iridomyrmex obscurior =

Species of ant

Iridomyrmex obscurior is a species of ant in the genus Iridomyrmex. Described by Auguste-Henri Forel in 1902, the species is endemic to Australia.
