= Iridomyrmex cyaneus =

Scientific classification
- Kingdom: Animalia
- Phylum: Arthropoda
- Class: Insecta
- Order: Hymenoptera
- Family: Formicidae
- Subfamily: Dolichoderinae
- Genus: Iridomyrmex
- Species: I. cyaneus

Binomial name
- Iridomyrmex cyaneus Wheeler, W.M., 1915

Species of ant

Iridomyrmex cyaneus is a species of ant in the genus Iridomyrmex. Described by Wheeler in 1915, these ants prefer dry desert like habitats in Australia, ranging from New South Wales to South Australia and Western Australia.
