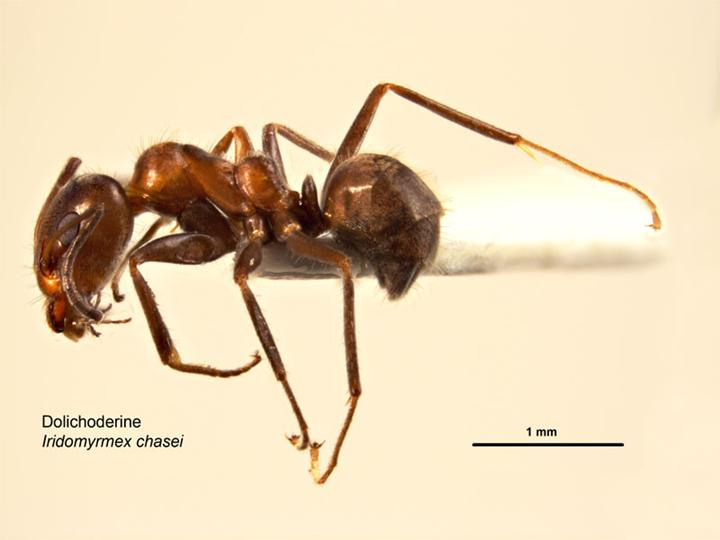

Scientific classification
- Kingdom: Animalia
- Phylum: Arthropoda
- Clade: Pancrustacea
- Class: Insecta
- Order: Hymenoptera
- Family: Formicidae
- Subfamily: Dolichoderinae
- Genus: Iridomyrmex
- Species: I. chasei

Binomial name
- Iridomyrmex chasei Forel, 1902

= Iridomyrmex chasei =

Species of ant

Iridomyrmex chasei is an ant belonging to the genus Iridomyrmex. The species was described by Auguste-Henri Forel in 1902, the species is mainly abundant nationwide in Australia, with an exception of its presence in Tasmania. This species is widely known for its large and highly populated nests.

== Taxonomy ==
I. chasei is commonly known as the 'native odorous garden ant'. This species is a part of the genera Iridomyrmex which belongs to the subfamily of ants called Dolichoderinae. There are a total of 63 described native Iridomyrmex in Australia. I.chasei was first described by Auguste-Henri Forel in 1902. Forel also described two potential sub-species; Iridomyrmex chasei concolor in 1902 and Iridomyrmex chasei yalgooensis in 1907. The species have a close genetic relationship to Iridomyrmex rufoniger and morpholoically likened to Iridomyrmex gibbus.

== Identification ==
Iridomyrmex chasei are approximately 4 mm long. Iridomyrmex chasei is similar in appearance to its relatives but can be distinguished by its bulging pronotum that slopes downwards towards the head, a protruding propodeum and head capsules with a concave vertex. They are commonly produce a distinct odorous smell when they are crushed. The species have been observed with both hairy and smooth legs.

== Distribution and habitat ==
Iridomyrmex chasei is occurs across all states in Australia except Tasmania. I. chasei nests on open ground. They occur in drier temperate climates and occupy sandy soils and heathlands where they from large colonies. It is common around Perth, Western Australia where it is considered a garden pest and less common in timbered and modified rural habitats.

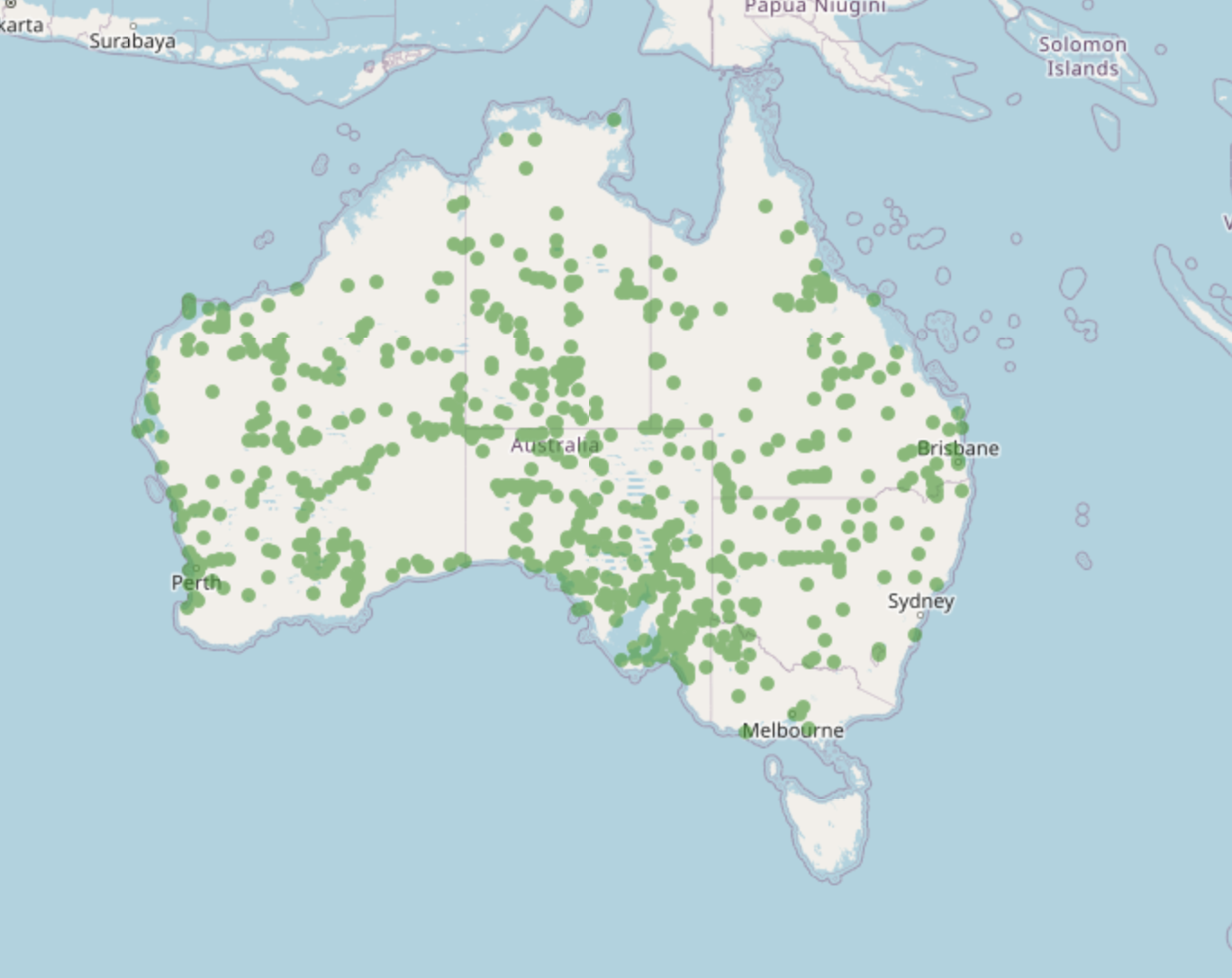
Distribution of Iridomyrmex chasei

== Diet and behaviour ==
Like most ants Iridomyrmex chasei are colonial form large nests on open ground. Iridomyrmex chasei is a foraging species that feeds on carron, nectar and honeydew. I. chasei utilises carbohydrates from plants as a food source. Colonies peak in spring and summer, displacing large quantiles of sand through high burrowing activity. The species is known to be aggressive and will bite and attack invaders of all sizes.

== Gallery ==
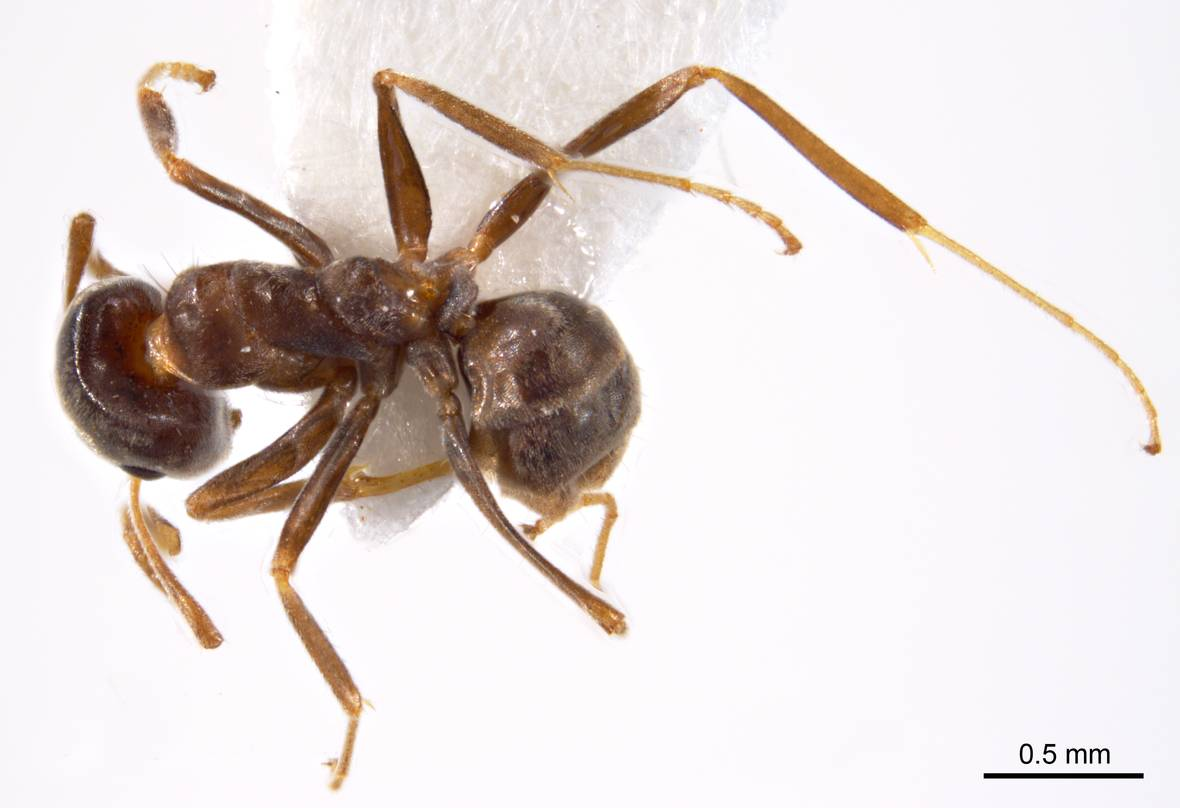

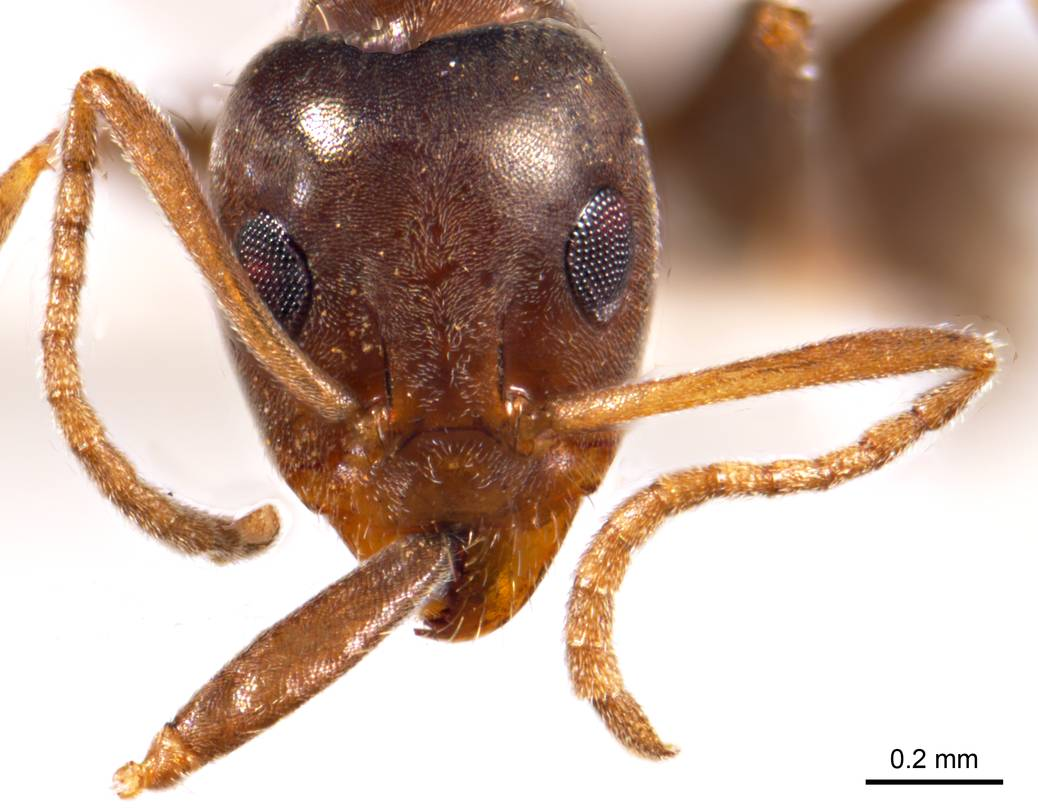

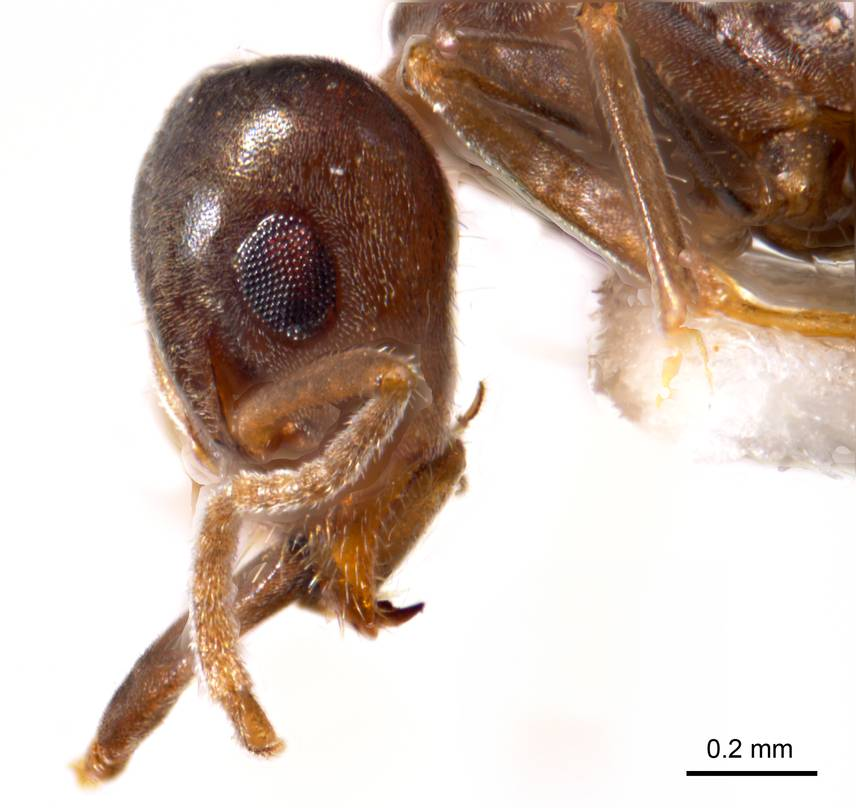

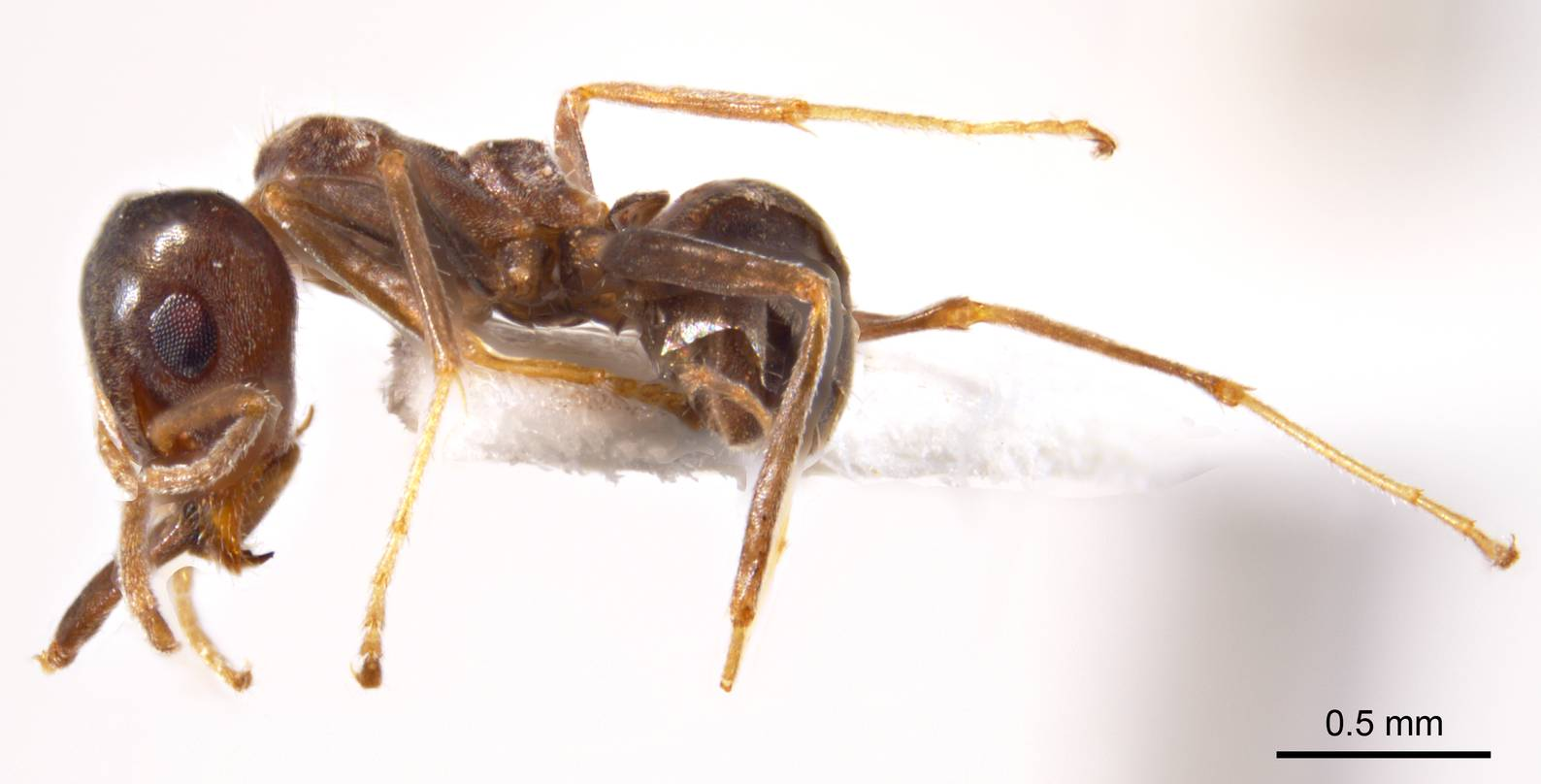
