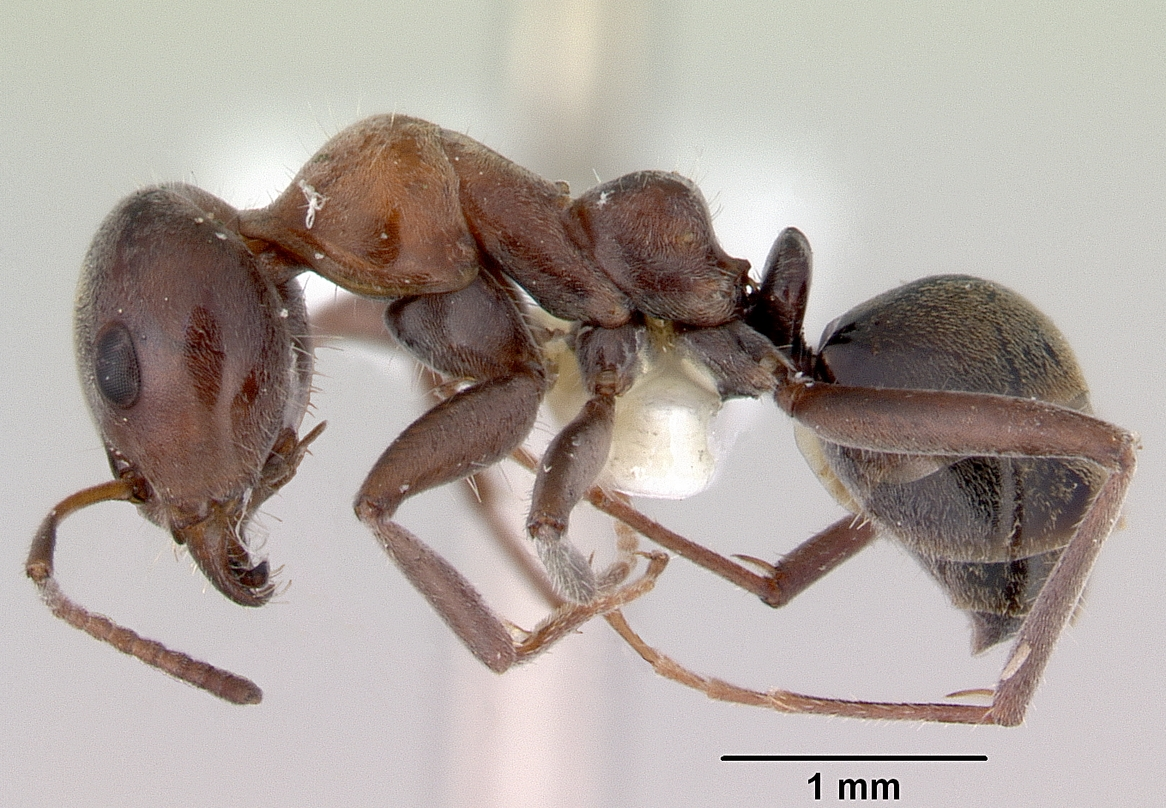

Scientific classification
- Kingdom: Animalia
- Phylum: Arthropoda
- Class: Insecta
- Order: Hymenoptera
- Family: Formicidae
- Subfamily: Dolichoderinae
- Genus: Iridomyrmex
- Species: I. anderseni

Binomial name
- Iridomyrmex anderseni Shattuck, 1993

= Iridomyrmex anderseni =

Species of ant

Iridomyrmex anderseni is an ant species of the genus Iridomyrmex. Nothing is known of its biology. One single specimen has been only been collected in South Australia. The species was described by Shattuck in 1993.
