= Iridomyrmex rubriceps =

Scientific classification
- Kingdom: Animalia
- Phylum: Arthropoda
- Class: Insecta
- Order: Hymenoptera
- Family: Formicidae
- Subfamily: Dolichoderinae
- Genus: Iridomyrmex
- Species: I. rubriceps

Binomial name
- Iridomyrmex rubriceps Forel, 1902

Species of ant

Iridomyrmex rubriceps is a species of ant in the genus Iridomyrmex. Described by Auguste-Henri Forel in 1902, the species is endemic to Australia, living in rainforest and wet sclerophyll habitats, commonly seen in the east coast of the country.
