= Iridomyrmex elongatus =

Scientific classification
- Kingdom: Animalia
- Phylum: Arthropoda
- Class: Insecta
- Order: Hymenoptera
- Family: Formicidae
- Subfamily: Dolichoderinae
- Genus: Iridomyrmex
- Species: I. elongatus

Binomial name
- Iridomyrmex elongatus Heterick & Shattuck, 2011

Species of ant

Iridomyrmex elongatus is a species of ant in the genus Iridomyrmex, described by Heterick and Shattuck in 2011. Its biology is almost unknown, but the distribution of the ant extends from Western Australia and into the Northern Territory.

== Etymology ==
The species name derives from the Latin language, which makes reference to its slender appearance.
