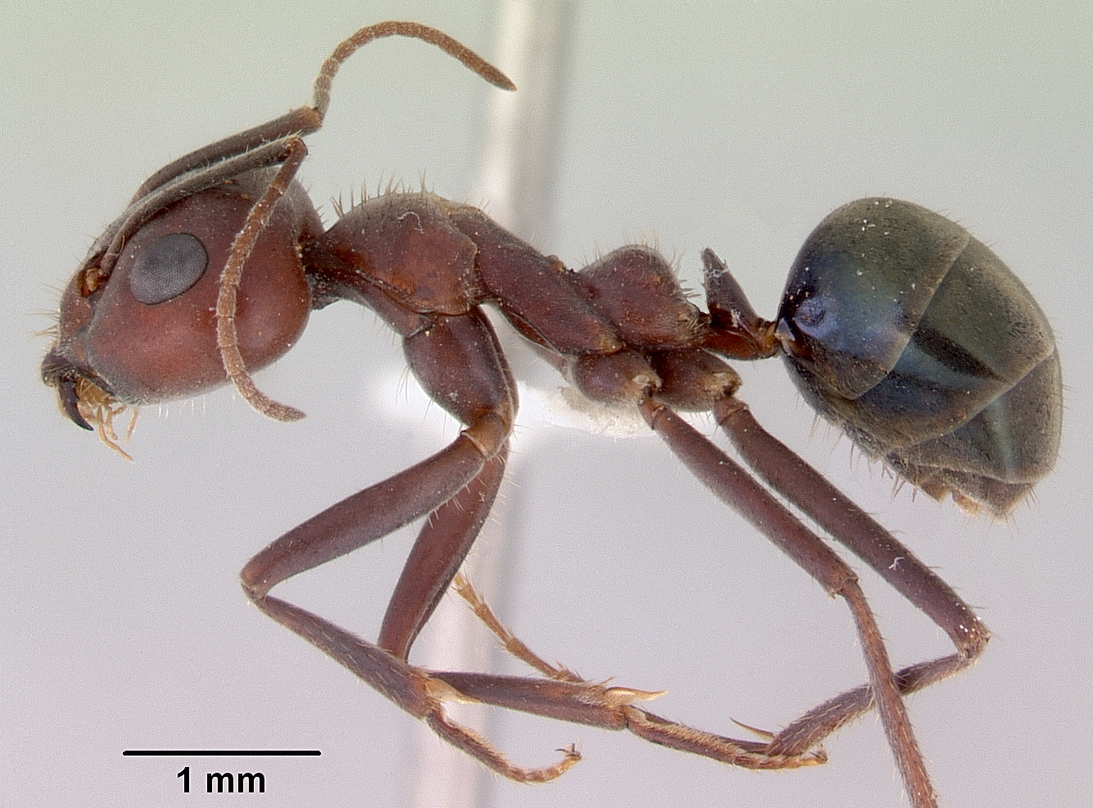

Scientific classification
- Kingdom: Animalia
- Phylum: Arthropoda
- Class: Insecta
- Order: Hymenoptera
- Family: Formicidae
- Subfamily: Dolichoderinae
- Genus: Iridomyrmex
- Species: I. bigi

Binomial name
- Iridomyrmex bigi Shattuck, 1993

= Iridomyrmex bigi =

Species of ant

Iridomyrmex bigi is a species of ant that is native to several regions of Australia. Belonging to the genus Iridomyrmex, the species was first described by Shattuck in 1993.
