= Iridomyrmex spodipilus =

Scientific classification
- Kingdom: Animalia
- Phylum: Arthropoda
- Class: Insecta
- Order: Hymenoptera
- Family: Formicidae
- Subfamily: Dolichoderinae
- Genus: Iridomyrmex
- Species: I. spodipilus

Binomial name
- Iridomyrmex spodipilus Shattuck, 1993

Species of ant

Iridomyrmex spodipilus is a species of ant in the genus Iridomyrmex. Described by Shattuck in 1993, the ant is endemic to Australia, and specimens have only been found in from Fowlers Gap in New South Wales, while foraging on low shrub and grassland.
