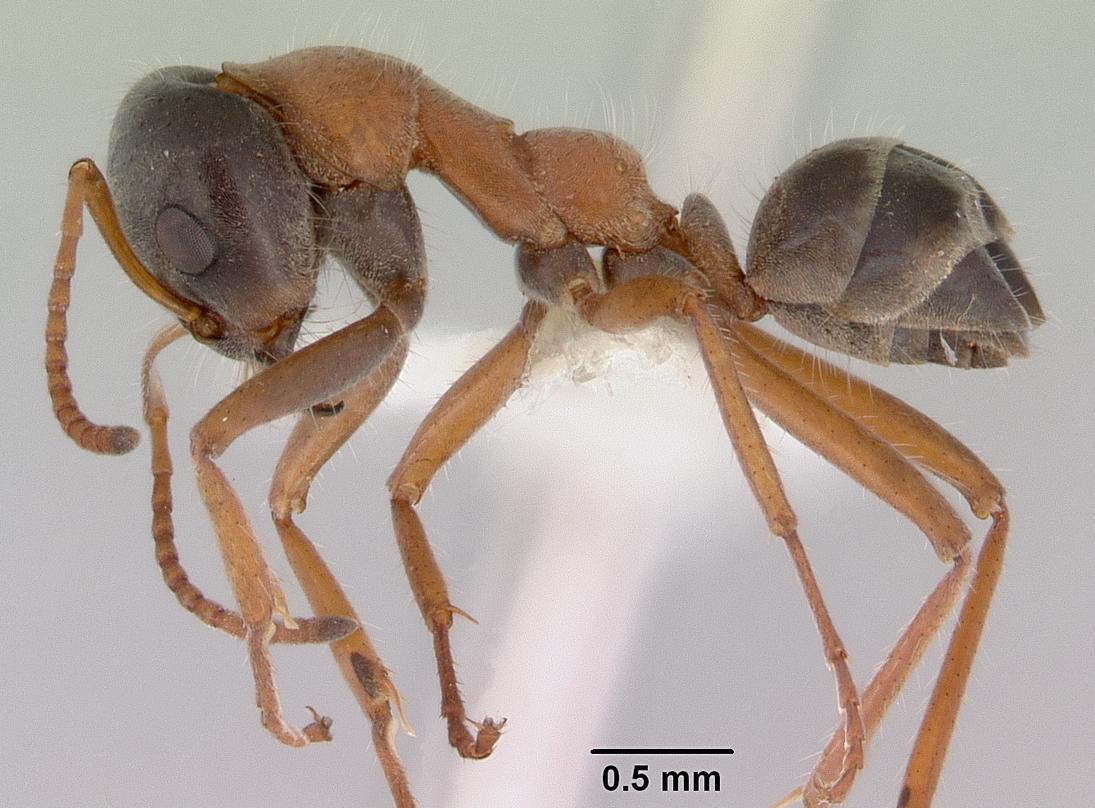
- Iridomyrmex cephaloinclinus worker, holotype

Scientific classification
- Kingdom: Animalia
- Phylum: Arthropoda
- Class: Insecta
- Order: Hymenoptera
- Family: Formicidae
- Subfamily: Dolichoderinae
- Genus: Iridomyrmex
- Species: I. cephaloinclinus

Binomial name
- Iridomyrmex cephaloinclinus Shattuck, 1993

= Iridomyrmex cephaloinclinus =

Species of ant

Iridomyrmex cephaloinclinus is a species of ant belonging to the genus Iridomyrmex. It was described by Shattuck in 1993, the species is abundant to several states in Australia.
