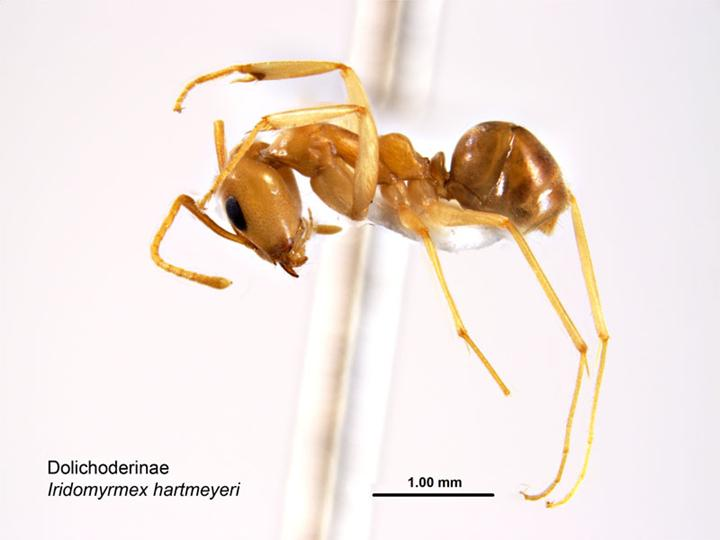

Scientific classification
- Kingdom: Animalia
- Phylum: Arthropoda
- Class: Insecta
- Order: Hymenoptera
- Family: Formicidae
- Subfamily: Dolichoderinae
- Genus: Iridomyrmex
- Species: I. hartmeyeri

Binomial name
- Iridomyrmex hartmeyeri Forel, 1907

= Iridomyrmex hartmeyeri =

Species of ant

Iridomyrmex hartmeyeri is a species of ant in the genus Iridomyrmex. Described by Auguste-Henri Forel in 1907, the ant is a nocturnal forager, and it distributed in most of Australia.
