= Iridomyrmex luteoclypeatus =

Scientific classification
- Kingdom: Animalia
- Phylum: Arthropoda
- Class: Insecta
- Order: Hymenoptera
- Family: Formicidae
- Subfamily: Dolichoderinae
- Genus: Iridomyrmex
- Species: I. luteoclypeatus

Binomial name
- Iridomyrmex luteoclypeatus Heterick & Shattuck, 2011

Species of ant

Iridomyrmex luteoclypeatus is a species of ant in the genus Iridomyrmex. Described by Heterick and Shattuck in 2011, nothing is essentially known about the ant, other than the ant being found in the drier regions of Australia and is diurnal.

== Etymology ==
The name derives from the Latin language, which luteus translates to 'yellow' and clypeatus translates to 'shield-shaped'.
