= Iridomyrmex continentis =

Scientific classification
- Kingdom: Animalia
- Phylum: Arthropoda
- Class: Insecta
- Order: Hymenoptera
- Family: Formicidae
- Subfamily: Dolichoderinae
- Genus: Iridomyrmex
- Species: I. continentis

Binomial name
- Iridomyrmex continentis Forel, 1907

Species of ant

Iridomyrmex continentis is a species of ant in the genus Iridomyrmex. Encountered most of the time in drier regions of Australia, it was described by Auguste-Henri Forel in 1907.
