= Iridomyrmex tenebrans =

Scientific classification
- Kingdom: Animalia
- Phylum: Arthropoda
- Class: Insecta
- Order: Hymenoptera
- Family: Formicidae
- Subfamily: Dolichoderinae
- Genus: Iridomyrmex
- Species: I. tenebrans

Binomial name
- Iridomyrmex tenebrans Heterick & Shattuck, 2011

Species of ant

Iridomyrmex tenebrans is a species of ant in the genus Iridomyrmex. Described by Heterick and Shattuck in 2011, the ant is a rare species endemic to Australia, with only one specimen being collected in New South Wales.

== Etymology ==
The name derives from the Latin Language, and the name is translated to 'rendered obscure'.
