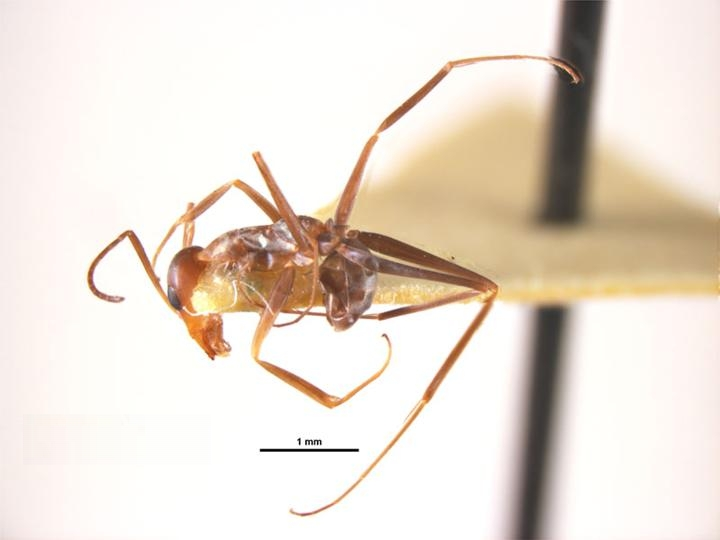

Scientific classification
- Kingdom: Animalia
- Phylum: Arthropoda
- Class: Insecta
- Order: Hymenoptera
- Family: Formicidae
- Subfamily: Dolichoderinae
- Genus: Iridomyrmex
- Species: I. tenuiceps

Binomial name
- Iridomyrmex tenuiceps Heterick & Shattuck, 2011

= Iridomyrmex tenuiceps =

Species of ant

Iridomyrmex tenuiceps is a species of ant in the genus Iridomyrmex. Described by Heterick and Shattuck in 2011, the species is widespread in Australia.

== Etymology ==
The name derives from the Latin Language, and is in reference to the slender head of the species.
