= Iridomyrmex nudipes =

Scientific classification
- Kingdom: Animalia
- Phylum: Arthropoda
- Class: Insecta
- Order: Hymenoptera
- Family: Formicidae
- Subfamily: Dolichoderinae
- Genus: Iridomyrmex
- Species: I. nudipes

Binomial name
- Iridomyrmex nudipes Heterick & Shattuck, 2011

Species of ant

Iridomyrmex nudipes is a species of ant in the genus Iridomyrmex. Described by Heterick and Shattuck in 2011, the workers of the species are diurnal foragers, and have only been recorded in New South Wales.

== Etymology ==
The name derives from the Latin language, which translates as 'naked foot', nudus meaning 'naked' and pes meaning 'foot'.
