= Iridomyrmex mapesi =

†Iridomyrmex mapesi Temporal range: Fossil

Scientific classification
- Domain: Eukaryota
- Kingdom: Animalia
- Phylum: Arthropoda
- Class: Insecta
- Order: Hymenoptera
- Family: Formicidae
- Subfamily: Dolichoderinae
- Genus: Iridomyrmex
- Species: I. mapesi

Binomial name
- Iridomyrmex mapesi Wilson, 1985

Species of ant

Iridomyrmex mapesi is an extinct species of ant in the genus Iridomyrmex. Described by Wilson in 1985 in the United States, the fossil found is in a considered poor condition
