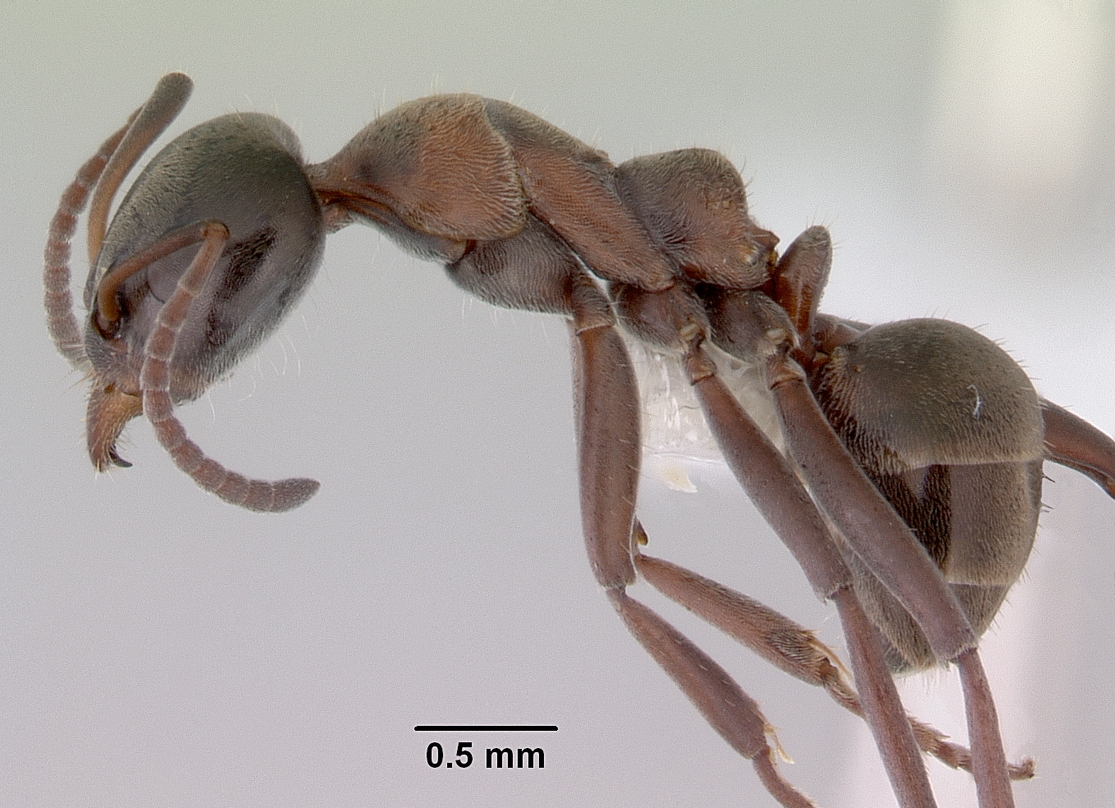

Scientific classification
- Kingdom: Animalia
- Phylum: Arthropoda
- Class: Insecta
- Order: Hymenoptera
- Family: Formicidae
- Subfamily: Dolichoderinae
- Genus: Iridomyrmex
- Species: I. hesperus

Binomial name
- Iridomyrmex hesperus Shattuck, 1993

= Iridomyrmex hesperus =

Species of ant

Iridomyrmex hesperus is a species of ant in the genus Iridomyrmex. Described by Shattuck in 1993, not much is known about the ant, other than its populations are mostly confined in Western Australia.
