= Iridomyrmex hertogi =

Scientific classification
- Kingdom: Animalia
- Phylum: Arthropoda
- Class: Insecta
- Order: Hymenoptera
- Family: Formicidae
- Subfamily: Dolichoderinae
- Genus: Iridomyrmex
- Species: I. hertogi

Binomial name
- Iridomyrmex hertogi Heterick & Shattuck, 2011

Species of ant

Iridomyrmex hertogi is a species of ant in the genus Iridomyrmex. Described by Heterick and Shattuck in 2011, the ant is essentially unknown in terms of its habitat preference and biology, although specimens were collected in the Northern Territory.

== Etymology ==
The ant was named after Tony Hertog.
