= Iridomyrmex calvus =

Scientific classification
- Kingdom: Animalia
- Phylum: Arthropoda
- Class: Insecta
- Order: Hymenoptera
- Family: Formicidae
- Subfamily: Dolichoderinae
- Genus: Iridomyrmex
- Species: I. calvus

Binomial name
- Iridomyrmex calvus Emery, 1914

Species of ant

Iridomyrmex calvus is a species of ant belonging to the genus Iridomyrmex. Described in 1914, the species is native to Australia and New Caledonia.
