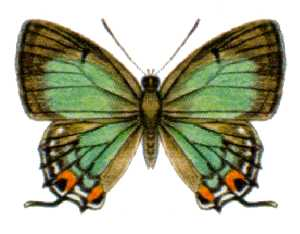

Scientific classification
- Domain: Eukaryota
- Kingdom: Animalia
- Phylum: Arthropoda
- Class: Insecta
- Order: Lepidoptera
- Family: Lycaenidae
- Tribe: Zesiini
- Genus: Jalmenus
- Species: J. eichhorni

Binomial name
- Jalmenus eichhorni Staudinger, 1888

Synonyms
- Ialmenus eichhorni Staudinger, 1888; Ialmenus itonus Miskin, 1890

= Jalmenus eichhorni =

Species of butterfly

Jalmenus eichhorni, the northern hairstreak or northern imperial blue, is a butterfly of the family Lycaenidae. It is endemic to Queensland, Australia, including Cape York.

The wingspan is about 30 mm.

The larvae feed on a various Acacia species, including A. crassicarpa, A. leptocarpa, A. humifusa and A. holosericea.

The caterpillars are attended by the ant species Iridomyrmex gracilis, Iridomyrmex reburrus and Iridomyrmex sanguineus.
