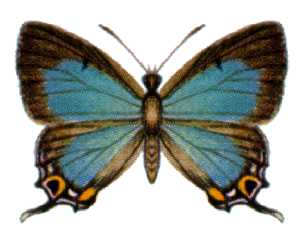

Scientific classification
- Domain: Eukaryota
- Kingdom: Animalia
- Phylum: Arthropoda
- Class: Insecta
- Order: Lepidoptera
- Family: Lycaenidae
- Tribe: Zesiini
- Genus: Jalmenus
- Species: J. ictinus

Binomial name
- Jalmenus ictinus Hewitson, [1865]

Synonyms
- Ialmenus ictinus Hewitson, 1865; Austromyrina schraderi Felder, C. & Felder, R. 1865; Ialmenus ictinus kooronya Edwards, 1956; Ialmenus ictinus penunga Edwards, 1956

= Jalmenus ictinus =

Species of butterfly

Jalmenus ictinus, the Ictinus blue or stencilled hairstreak, is a butterfly of the family Lycaenidae. It is found in Australia in the Australian Capital Territory, New South Wales, Queensland and Victoria.

The wingspan is about 30 mm.

The larvae feed on a various Acacia species, including A. bidwillii, A. dealbata, A. decurrens, A. harpophylla, A. implexa, A. mearnsii, A. melanoxylon, A. pendula and A. rubida, as well as Heterodendrum diversifolium.

The caterpillars are attended by the ant species Iridomyrmex purpureus and Iridomyrmex spadius.
