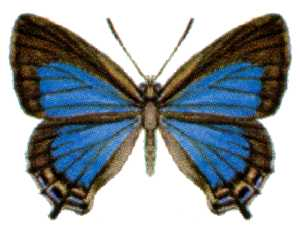

Scientific classification
- Kingdom: Animalia
- Phylum: Arthropoda
- Class: Insecta
- Order: Lepidoptera
- Family: Lycaenidae
- Tribe: Zesiini
- Genus: Jalmenus
- Species: J. inous

Binomial name
- Jalmenus inous Hewitson, [1865]

= Jalmenus inous =

Species of butterfly

Jalmenus inous, the Inous blue or varied hairstreak, is a butterfly of the family Lycaenidae. It is endemic to coastal Western Australia.

The wingspan is about 30 mm.

The larvae feed on a various plants, including Gastrolobium microcarpum, Daviesia divaricata, Daviesia benthamii, Acacia rostellifera and Acacia saligna.

The caterpillars are attended by the ant species Iridomyrmex conifer and Iridomyrmex rufoniger.

== Subspecies ==
- Jalmenus inous bronwynae Johnson & Valentine, 2007 (coastal Western Australia)
- Jalmenus inous inous Hewitson, 1865 (south-west coast of Western Australia)
- Jalmenus inous notocrucifer Johnson, Hay & Bollam, 1992 (south-west coast of Western Australia)
