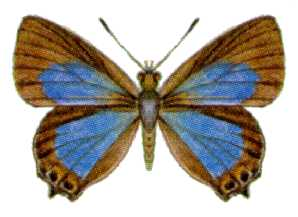

Scientific classification
- Domain: Eukaryota
- Kingdom: Animalia
- Phylum: Arthropoda
- Class: Insecta
- Order: Lepidoptera
- Family: Lycaenidae
- Tribe: Zesiini
- Genus: Jalmenus
- Species: J. icilius

Binomial name
- Jalmenus icilius (Hewitson, [1865])

Synonyms
- Ialmenus icilius Hewitson, 1865; Cupido oeneus Tepper, 1882; Ialmenus icilius mitchelli Edwards, 1951; Ialmenus icilius obscurus Edwards, 1951; Ialmenus icilius parvus Burns, 1951

= Jalmenus icilius =

Species of butterfly

Jalmenus icilius, the Icilius blue or amethyst hairstreak, is a butterfly of the family Lycaenidae. It is found in all mainland states of Australia, throughout much of the subtropical areas of the inland, from the Selwyn Range and from Carnarvon to Kalgoorlie. It is generally common except in the south-eastern end of its range in central and western Victoria, where it is now very scarce.

The wingspan is about 30 mm.

The larvae feed on a wide range of plants, including Cassia artemisioides, Cassia nemophila, Daviesia benthamii, and the Acacia species: A. acuminata, A. anceps, A. aneura, A. dealbata, A. deanei, A. harpophylla, A. mearnsii, A. parramattensis, A. pendula, A. pycnantha, A. rubida, A. saligna and A. victoriae.

The caterpillars are attended by the ant species Iridomyrmex rufoniger.

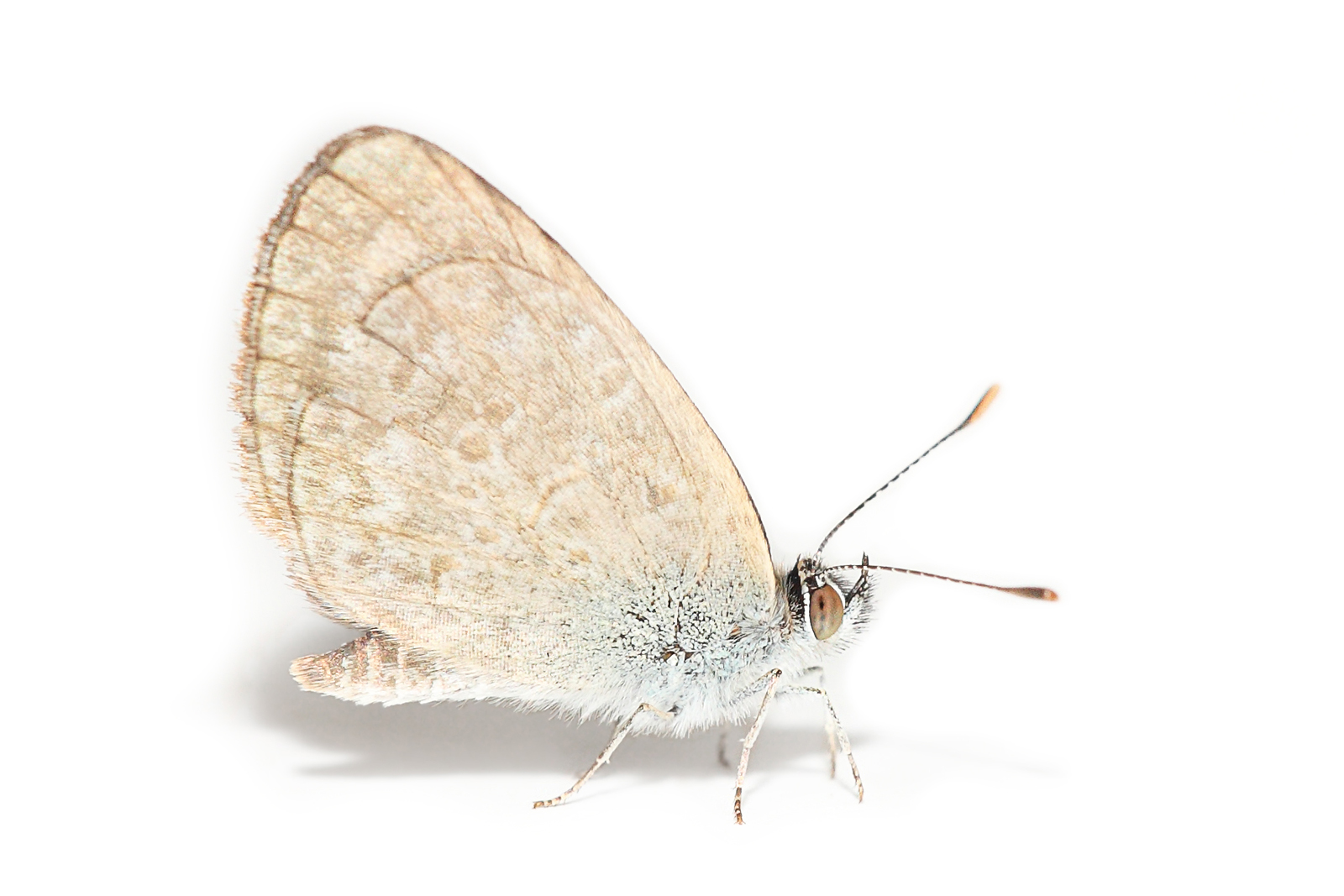
Melbourne
