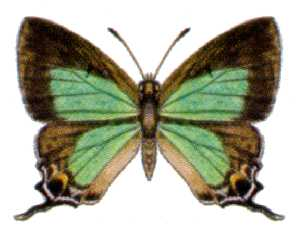

Scientific classification
- Kingdom: Animalia
- Phylum: Arthropoda
- Clade: Pancrustacea
- Class: Insecta
- Order: Lepidoptera
- Family: Lycaenidae
- Tribe: Zesiini
- Genus: Jalmenus
- Species: J. daemeli

Binomial name
- Jalmenus daemeli Semper, 1879

Synonyms
- Ialmenus daemeli Semper, 1879; Ialmenus illidgei Lucas, 1889

= Jalmenus daemeli =

Species of butterfly

Jalmenus daemeli, the Daemel's blue, Dämel's blue or emerald hairstreak, is a butterfly of the family Lycaenidae, and was first described in 1879 by Georg Semper It is endemic to the Australian states of New South Wales and Queensland, where it is found in coastal areas. It is named after Eduard Dämel, the collector of the type series (with Amalie Dietrich).

The wingspan is about 2 cm.

The larvae feed on a wide range of plants, including Acacia species, Eucalyptus melanophloia and Heterodendrum diversifolium.

The caterpillars are attended by the ant species Iridomyrmex rufoniger.
