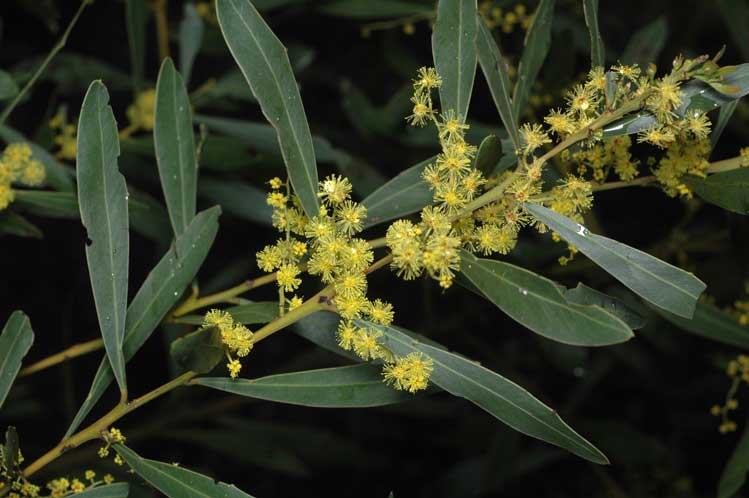
- In the Mount Annan Botanic Gardens

Scientific classification
- Kingdom: Plantae
- Clade: Tracheophytes
- Clade: Angiosperms
- Clade: Eudicots
- Clade: Rosids
- Order: Fabales
- Family: Fabaceae
- Subfamily: Caesalpinioideae
- Clade: Mimosoid clade
- Genus: Acacia
- Species: A. amoena

Binomial name
- Acacia amoena H.L.Wendl.
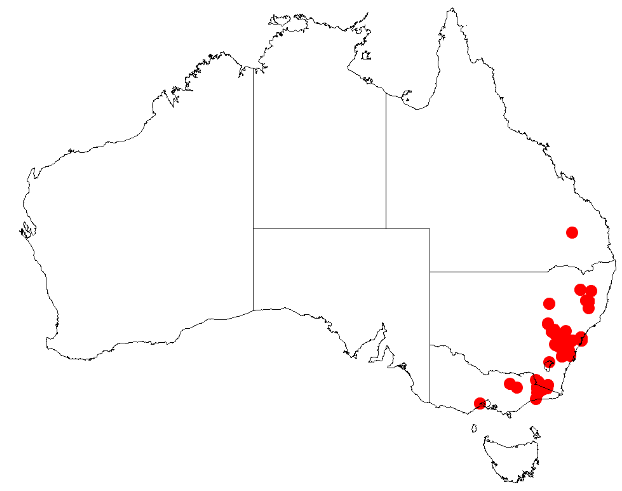
- Occurrence data from AVH

= Acacia amoena =

Boomerang wattle

Species of legume

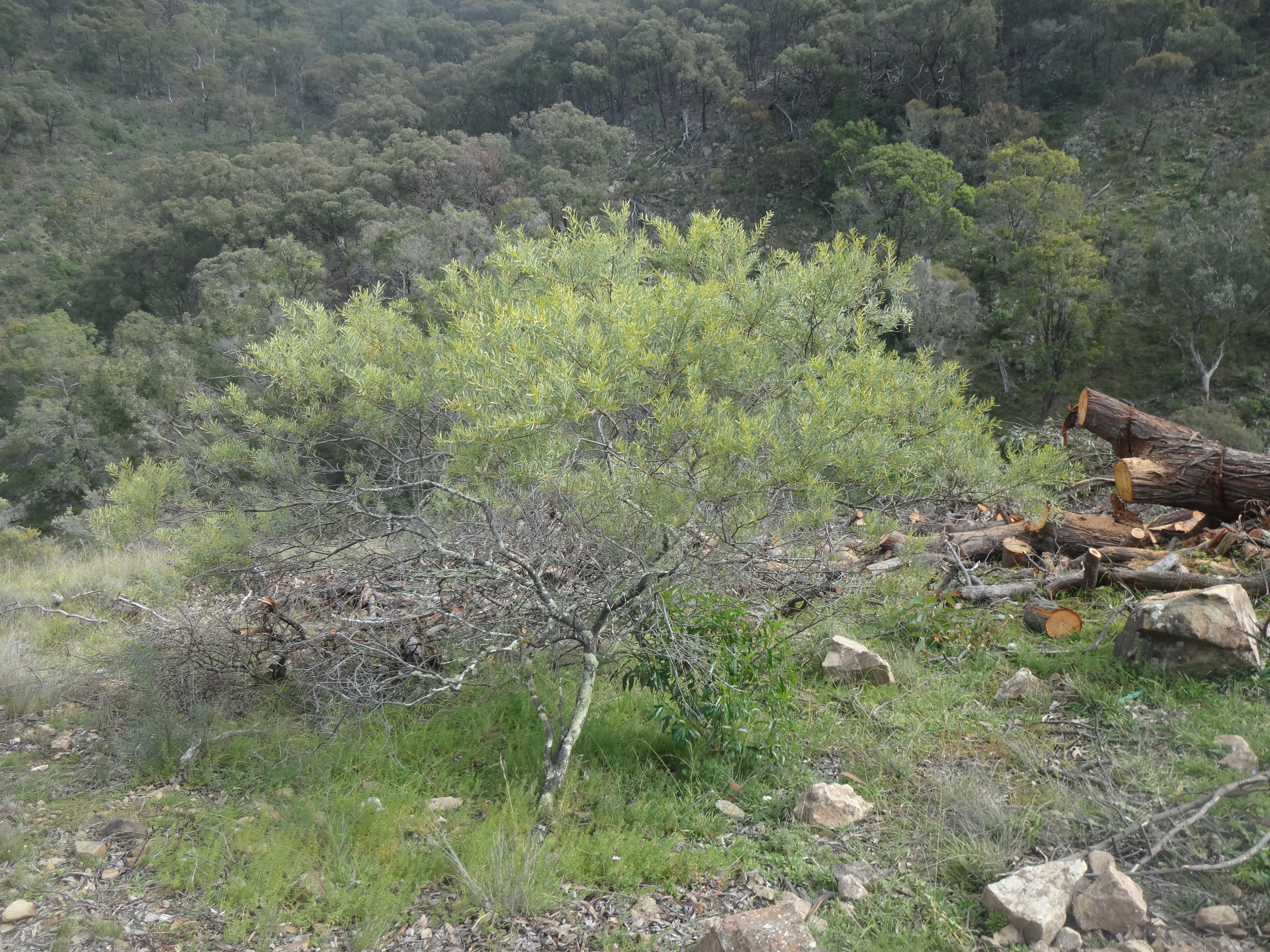
Habit

Acacia amoena, commonly known as boomerang wattle, is a species of flowering plant in the family Fabaceae and is endemic to south-eastern continental Australia. It is a shapely, erect or spreading shrub with usually lance-shaped to elliptic phyllodes, usually yellow or bright yellow flowers arranged in a raceme of 5 to 21 heads each with 6 to 12 flowers, and straight or curved pods 40–120 mm (1.6–4.7 in) long.

== Description ==
Acacia amoena is a shapely, erect or spreading shrub that typically grows to a height of 0.5 to 3 m (1 ft 8 in to 9 ft 10 in) and has glabrous reddish brown branchlets. Its phyllodes are more or less lance-shaped with the narrower end towards the base, to elliptic, mostly 30–75 mm (1.2–3.0 in) long and 5–12 mm (0.20–0.47 in) wide and sometimes slightly curved. The flowers are arranged in a racemes 10–65 mm (0.39–2.56 in) long with 5 to 21 heads, each head on a peduncle 2–4 mm (0.079–0.157 in) long with 6 to 12 usually bright yellow flowers. Flowering occurs from July to October and the pods are linear, firmly papery, up to 90 mm (3.5 in) long and 4–6.5 mm (0.16–0.26 in) wide and dark brown to black. The seeds are oblong to elliptic or egg-shaped, 3.5–5 mm (0.14–0.20 in) long and black with a club-shaped aril.

== Taxonomy ==
Acacia amoena first formally described by the botanist Heinrich Wendland in 1820 in his book, Commentatio de Acaciis aphyllis. The specific epithet (amoena) means 'beautiful' or 'pleasing'.

This species has been confused with Acacia rubida and belongs to the Acacia microbotrya group. It is closely related to Acacia kydrensis and is similar to Acacia chalkeri and Acacia rubida.

== Distribution and habitat ==
Boomerang wattle is found along the Great Dividing Range in western parts of New South Wales, Queensland and Victoria where it is often a part of dry sclerophyll forest or open woodland communities on rocky slopes and creek banks growing in rocky soils. The bulk of the population has a discontinuous distribution from around Walcha in the north down to the upper reaches of the Snowy River north-eastern Victoria.

== See also ==
- List of Acacia species
