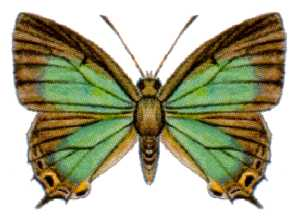

Scientific classification
- Domain: Eukaryota
- Kingdom: Animalia
- Phylum: Arthropoda
- Class: Insecta
- Order: Lepidoptera
- Family: Lycaenidae
- Tribe: Zesiini
- Genus: Jalmenus
- Species: J. lithochroa

Binomial name
- Jalmenus lithochroa Waterhouse, 1903

Synonyms
- Ialmenus lithochroa Waterhouse, 1903

= Jalmenus lithochroa =

Species of butterfly

Jalmenus lithochroa, the lithochroa blue or Waterhouse's hairstreak, is a butterfly of the family Lycaenidae. It is endemic to a small area around Adelaide in South Australia.

The wingspan is about 30 mm.

The larvae feed on Acacia pycnantha and Acacia victoriae.

The caterpillars are attended by the ant species Iridomyrmex purpureus and Iridomyrmex viridiaeneus.
