= Jalmenus eubulus =

Scientific classification
- Domain: Eukaryota
- Kingdom: Animalia
- Phylum: Arthropoda
- Class: Insecta
- Order: Lepidoptera
- Family: Lycaenidae
- Tribe: Zesiini
- Genus: Jalmenus
- Species: J. eubulus

Binomial name
- Jalmenus eubulus Miskin, 1876

Synonyms
- Ialmenus eubulus Miskin, 1876

Species of butterfly

Jalmenus eubulus (common name Pale imperial hairstreak) is a butterfly of the family Lycaenidae. It is found in the Australian states of New South Wales and Queensland, in the Murray-Darling basin. It was first described in 1876 by William Henry Miskin.

It was formerly considered to be a subspecies of Jalmenus evagoras (Jalmenus evagoras eubulus Miskin, 1876)

In 2021, it was considered likely to be extinct by 2040 with a 42% probability. It is considered a vulnerable species in Queensland, and a critically threatened species in New South Wales.

== Description ==
Miskin's original description:

Upperside: pearly white, with slightly opalescent hues. Primaries: With costa, apex and outer margin widely dark brown; small black transverse line at termination of cell. Secondaries: with the veins brown; outer margin narrowly bordered with brown, gradually decreasing to apex; a submarginal line of white from apical to anal angle; second and third median branches terminating in well developed tails; the first median and submedian forming points but not extended; between the two tails a large crescent of orange surmounting black border, and in the angle a patch of orange; between the orange patches black crowned with white, and above all a faint margin of brown.

Underside: greyish-white. Primaries: with outer edge of Aving dark brown; a marginal band of pale brown or fawn colour; an inner line of faint brown; a transverse interrupted streak of dark brown; three short discal streaks within cell. Secondaries: With edge, band, and transverse streak, as in primaries, the latter being elbowed twice, opposite the tails; a dark speck near base; a short dark streak in cell, one near costa, a longer one at termination of cell; orange spots as on upper side, but rather larger.

Thorax and abdomen: upperside dark grey; underside light grey.
