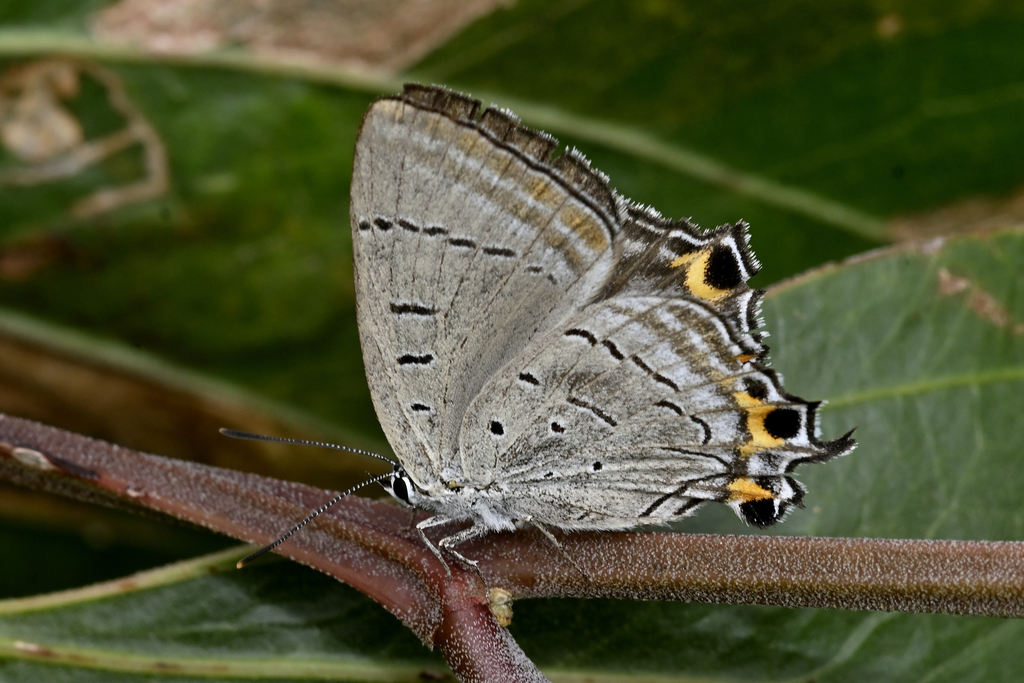

Scientific classification
- Kingdom: Animalia
- Phylum: Arthropoda
- Class: Insecta
- Order: Lepidoptera
- Family: Lycaenidae
- Tribe: Zesiini
- Genus: Jalmenus
- Species: J. pseudictinus

Binomial name
- Jalmenus pseudictinus Kerr & Macqueen, 1967

= Jalmenus pseudictinus =

Species of butterfly

Jalmenus pseudictinus, Macqueen's hairstreak, is a butterfly of the family Lycaenidae. It is endemic to the northern Gulf, the north-east coast and the Murray–Darling basin in Queensland, Australia.

The wingspan is about 30 mm.

The larvae feed on various Acacia species, including A. flavescens and A. harpophylla, as well as Heterodendrum diversifolium and Alectryon connatus.

The caterpillars are attended by the ant species Froggattella kirbii.
