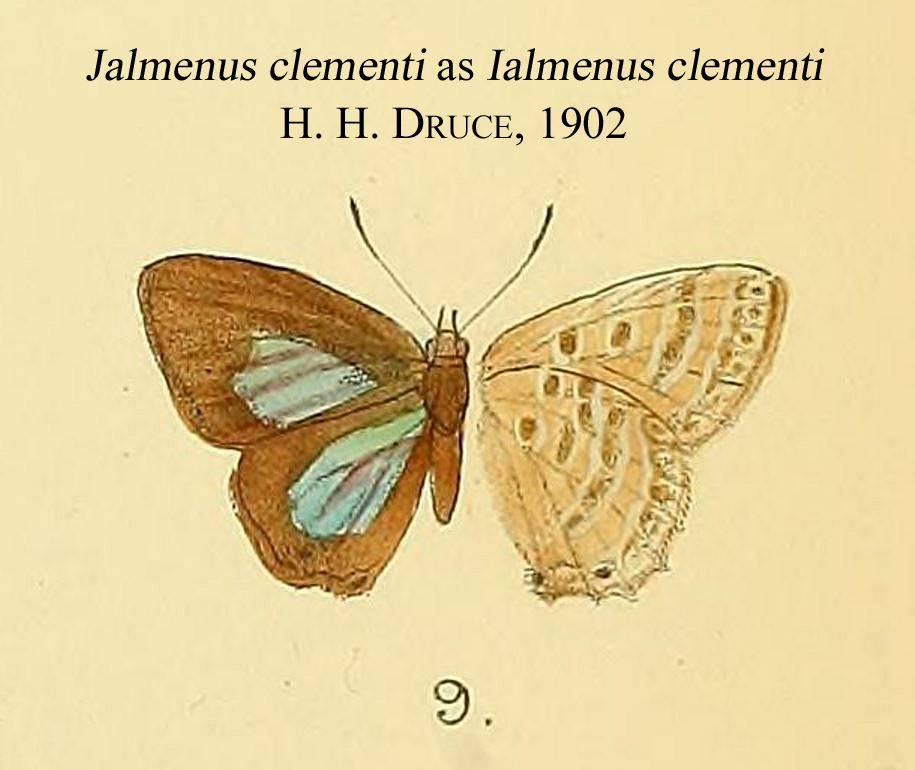
- Jalmenus clementi

Scientific classification
- Domain: Eukaryota
- Kingdom: Animalia
- Phylum: Arthropoda
- Class: Insecta
- Order: Lepidoptera
- Family: Lycaenidae
- Tribe: Zesiini
- Genus: Jalmenus
- Species: J. clementi

Binomial name
- Jalmenus clementi H. H. Druce, 1902

= Jalmenus clementi =

Species of butterfly

Jalmenus clementi, the turquoise hairstreak or Clement's blue, is a butterfly of the family Lycaenidae. The species was first described by Hamilton Herbert Druce in 1902. It is found along the north-west coast of Western Australia.

The larvae feed on various Acacia species, including A. alexandri, A. inaequilatera and A. tetragonophylla.

The caterpillars are attended by ants of the genus Iridomyrmex.
