= Iridomyrmex difficilis =

Scientific classification
- Kingdom: Animalia
- Phylum: Arthropoda
- Class: Insecta
- Order: Hymenoptera
- Family: Formicidae
- Subfamily: Dolichoderinae
- Genus: Iridomyrmex
- Species: I. difficilis

Binomial name
- Iridomyrmex difficilis Heterick & Shattuck, 2011

Species of ant

Iridomyrmex difficilis is a species of ant in the genus Iridomyrmex. Described in 2011, it is a widespread species in Australia as well as inhabiting the Torres Strait and off shorelines of Queensland.

== Distribution ==
The species is widespread in Australia and lives on shorelines and on islands, notably the Torres Strait, and can occupy a number of habitats, such as rainforests, grasslands, sclerophyll forests, acacia woodland and they nest in soil and under rocks, and they have also been found tending to the Caterpillar Jalmenus evagoras.

== Etymology ==
In Latin, the species name translates to 'troublesome' or 'difficult'.
