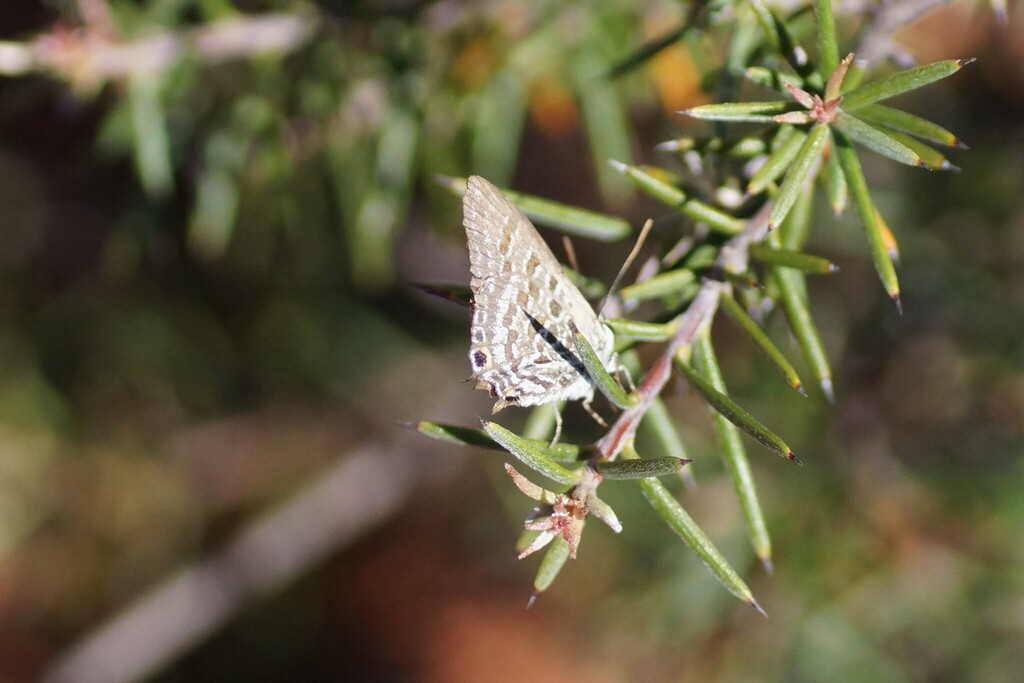

Scientific classification
- Kingdom: Animalia
- Phylum: Arthropoda
- Class: Insecta
- Order: Lepidoptera
- Family: Lycaenidae
- Tribe: Zesiini
- Genus: Jalmenus
- Species: J. aridus

Binomial name
- Jalmenus aridus Graham & Moulds, 1988

= Jalmenus aridus =

Species of butterfly

Jalmenus aridus, the inland hairstreak or desert blue, is a butterfly of the family Lycaenidae. It is only known from the area near Kalgoorlie in Western Australia, and is considered to be endangered species

The wingspan is about 25 mm.

The larvae feed on the leaves and flowers of Senna nemophila and Acacia tetragonophylla.

The caterpillars are attended by the ant species Froggattella kirbii.
