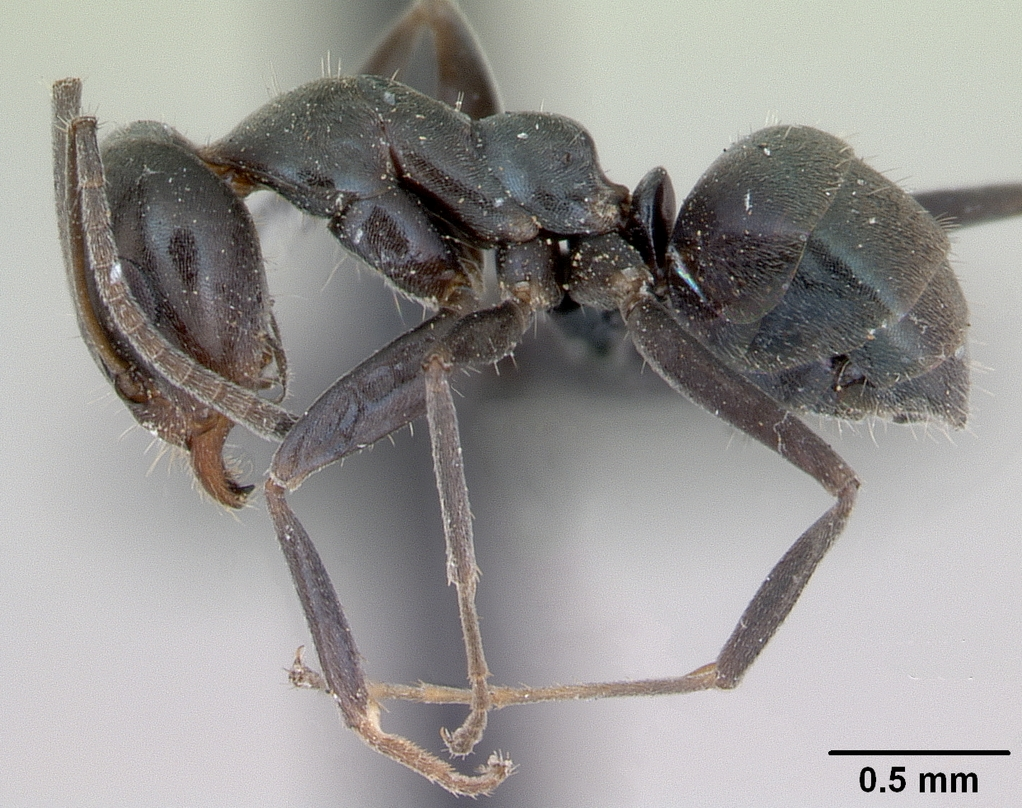

Scientific classification
- Kingdom: Animalia
- Phylum: Arthropoda
- Class: Insecta
- Order: Hymenoptera
- Family: Formicidae
- Subfamily: Dolichoderinae
- Genus: Iridomyrmex
- Species: I. anceps

Binomial name
- Iridomyrmex anceps Roger, 1863

= Iridomyrmex anceps =

Species of ant

Iridomyrmex anceps is an ant species of the genus Iridomyrmex. It has a very large distribution on multiple continents, but it is mainly distributed in northern Australia. Some specimens were found on multiple islands, and some were even found and collected in the United Arab Emirates.

Iridomyrmex anceps has a similar appearance to Iridomyrmex agilis. It was described by Julius Roger in 1863.

I. anceps is one of the most common attendant ants for larvae of the imperial hairstreak butterfly, Jalmenus evagoras.

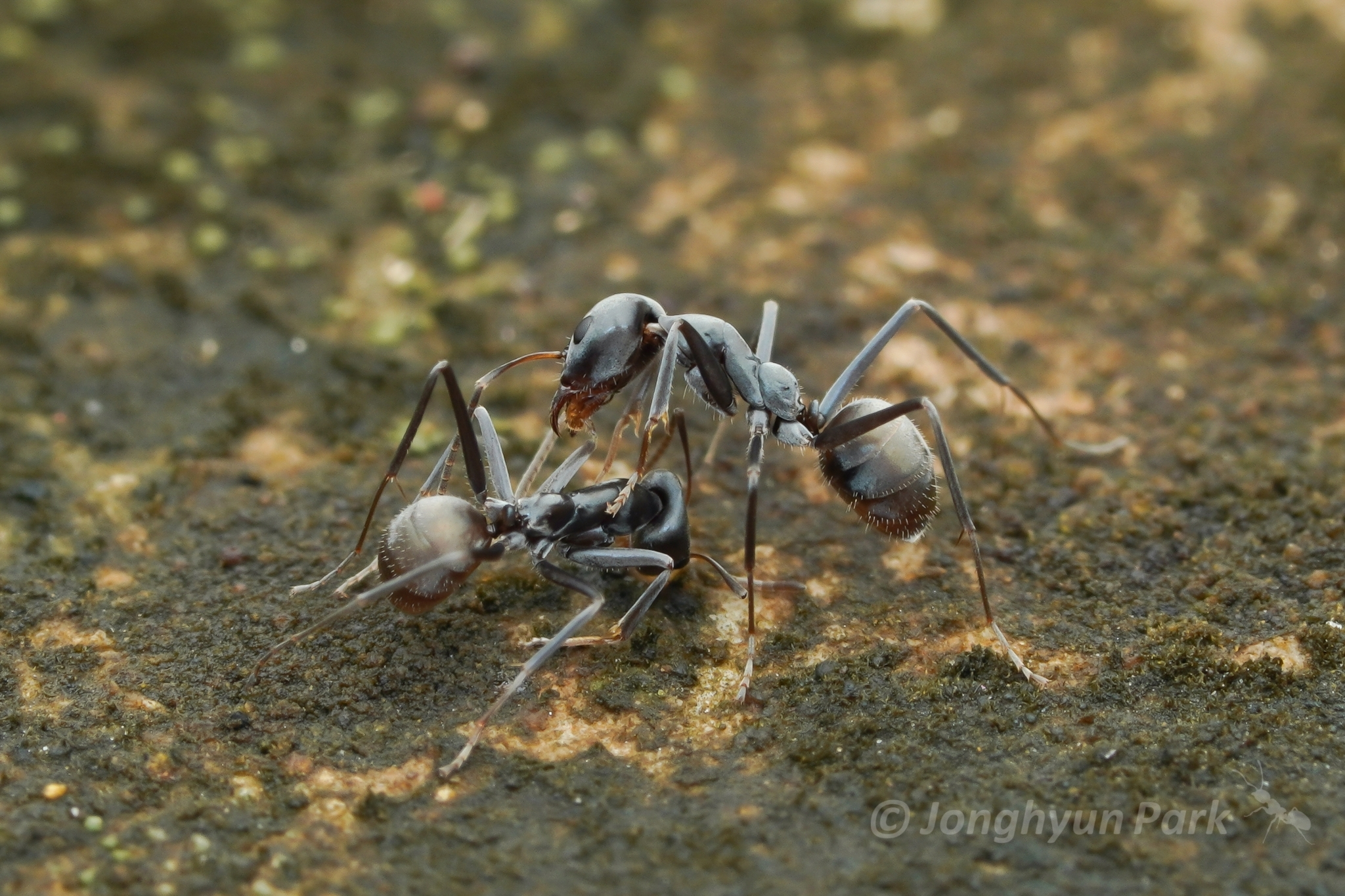
I. anceps from Thailand
