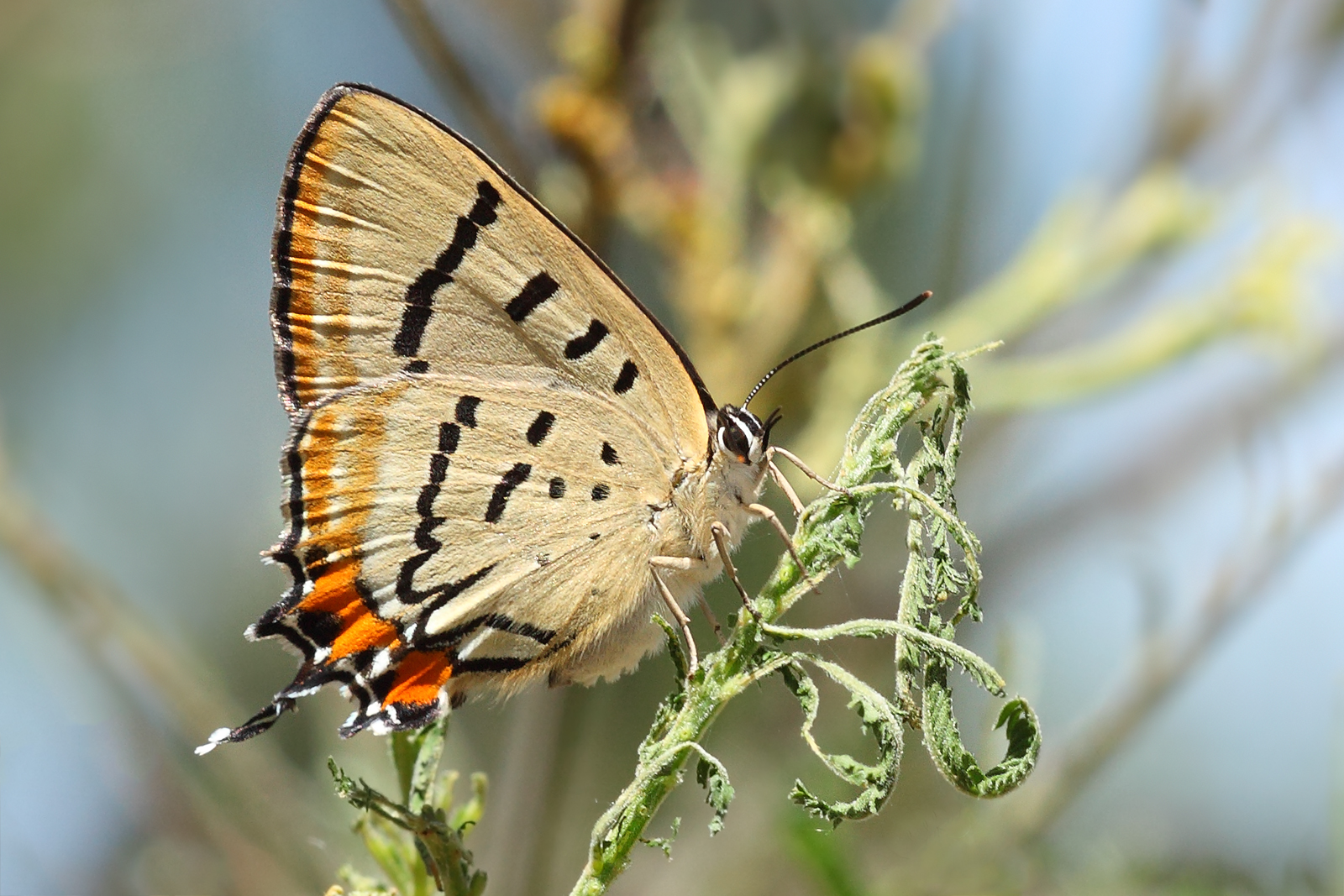
- Jalmenus evagoras

Scientific classification
- Kingdom: Animalia
- Phylum: Arthropoda
- Clade: Pancrustacea
- Class: Insecta
- Order: Lepidoptera
- Family: Lycaenidae
- Tribe: Zesiini
- Genus: Jalmenus; Hübner, 1818

Synonyms
- Ialmenus Hübner, 1818; Austromyrina Felder, C. & Felder, R., 1865; Protialmenus Waterhouse & Lyell, 1914

= Jalmenus =

Butterfly genus in family Lycaenidae

Jalmenus is a genus of butterflies in the family Lycaenidae. The genus is endemic to Australia.

== Species ==
- Jalmenus aridus Graham & Moulds, 1988 – inland hairstreak
- Jalmenus clementi Druce, 1902 – turquoise hairstreak
- Jalmenus daemeli Semper, 1879 – Dämel's blue, emerald hairstreak
- Jalmenus eichhorni Staudinger, 1888 – northern hairstreak, northern imperial blue
- Jalmenus eubulus Miskin, 1876
- Jalmenus evagoras (Donovan, 1805) – common imperial blue, imperial hairstreak
- Jalmenus icilius Hewitson, 1865 – amethyst hairstreak, Icilius blue
- Jalmenus ictinus Hewitson, 1865 – Ictinus blue, stencilled hairstreak
- Jalmenus inous Hewitson, 1865 – Inous blue, varied hairstreak
- Jalmenus lithochroa Waterhouse, 1903 – lithochroa blue, Waterhouse's hairstreak
- Jalmenus pseudictinus Kerr & Macqueen, 1967
