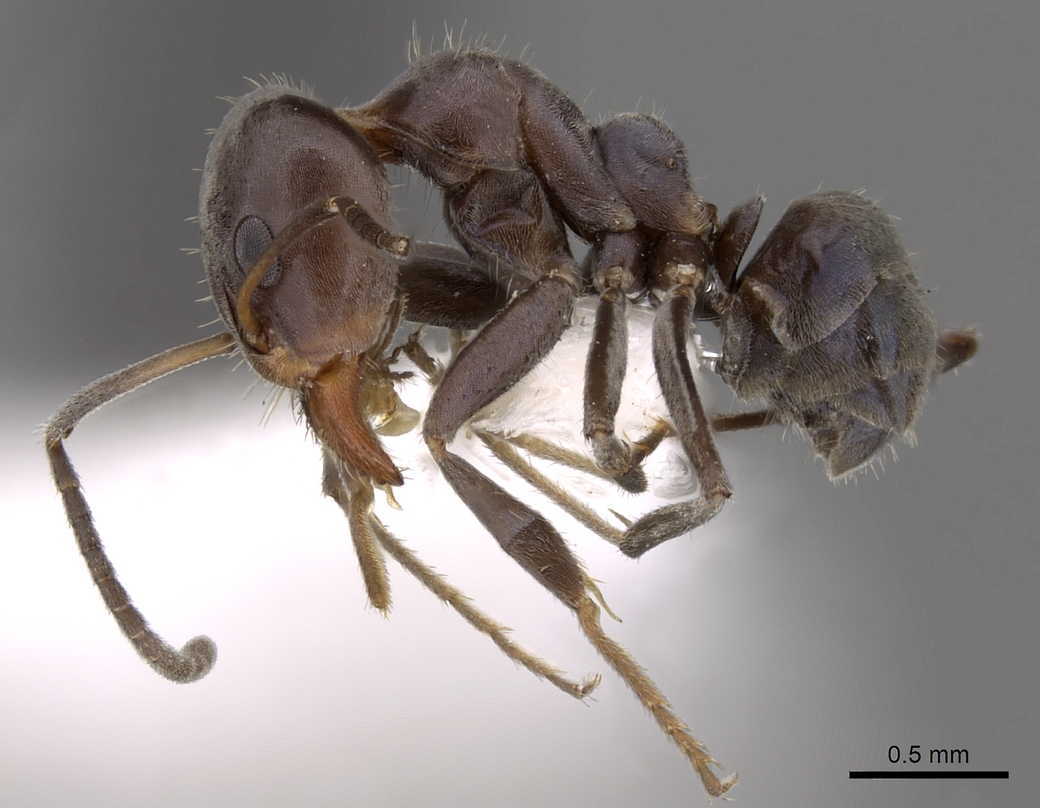
- I. rufoniger worker specimen

Scientific classification
- Kingdom: Animalia
- Phylum: Arthropoda
- Clade: Pancrustacea
- Class: Insecta
- Order: Hymenoptera
- Family: Formicidae
- Subfamily: Dolichoderinae
- Genus: Iridomyrmex
- Species: I. rufoniger

Binomial name
- Iridomyrmex rufoniger (Lowne, 1865)

Synonyms
- Iridomyrmex rufoniger domesticus Forel, 1907; Acantholepis mamillatus Lowne, 1865; Iridomyrmex rufoniger septentrionalis Forel, 1902

= Iridomyrmex rufoniger =

Species of ant

Iridomyrmex rufoniger, also known as the Tufted Tyrant Ant is a species of ant in the genus Iridomyrmex. It was described by Lowne in 1865. The species is endemic to Australia and introduced to several other countries.

== Taxonomy ==
The species was first described by Lowne in 1865, and the species has three synonyms. This includes Iridomyrmex rufoniger domesticus (Forel, 1907), Acantholepis mamillatus (Lowne, 1865), and Iridomyrmex rufoniger septentrionalis (Forel, 1902). The species is classified in the genus Iridiomyrmex, which is in the subfamily Dolichoderinae.

== Identification ==
The species is a part of the Iridomyrmex purpureus group, and is among the most familiar ant the Australian public is affiliated with. A typical worker is a medium-sized ant in comparison to its relatives within its genus, and will have a broad head, with a blue or yellowish-green iridescence on the worker's gaster. These ants in Sydney are different in variation and can be distinguished by their dark coloured appearance and small heads, which isn't normal when compared to other colonies elsewhere in Australia.

== Distribution ==
Iridomyrmex rufoniger ants are abundant in every state and territory in Australia, although it is rare in the Northern Territory, to the Solomon Islands, New Caledonia (perhaps introduced) and was introduced to New Zealand after being intercepted at the ports of Auckland and Freyberg, but it has not been formally established in the country. Nests are numerous, and are in the soil and depending where they live, they can be a dominant species. In Westonia, located in Western Australia are numerous colonies that have established themselves in mine dumps, but they are not common in surrounding bushland that has gone under rehabilitation. Nests are commonly found in loose dirt and under stones. Based on collections, the ants can be found on elevations ranging from 5 – 1580 metres (16 feet - 5,183 ft), and the mean elevation range specimens were collected was 244 metres (800 ft).

== Behaviour ==
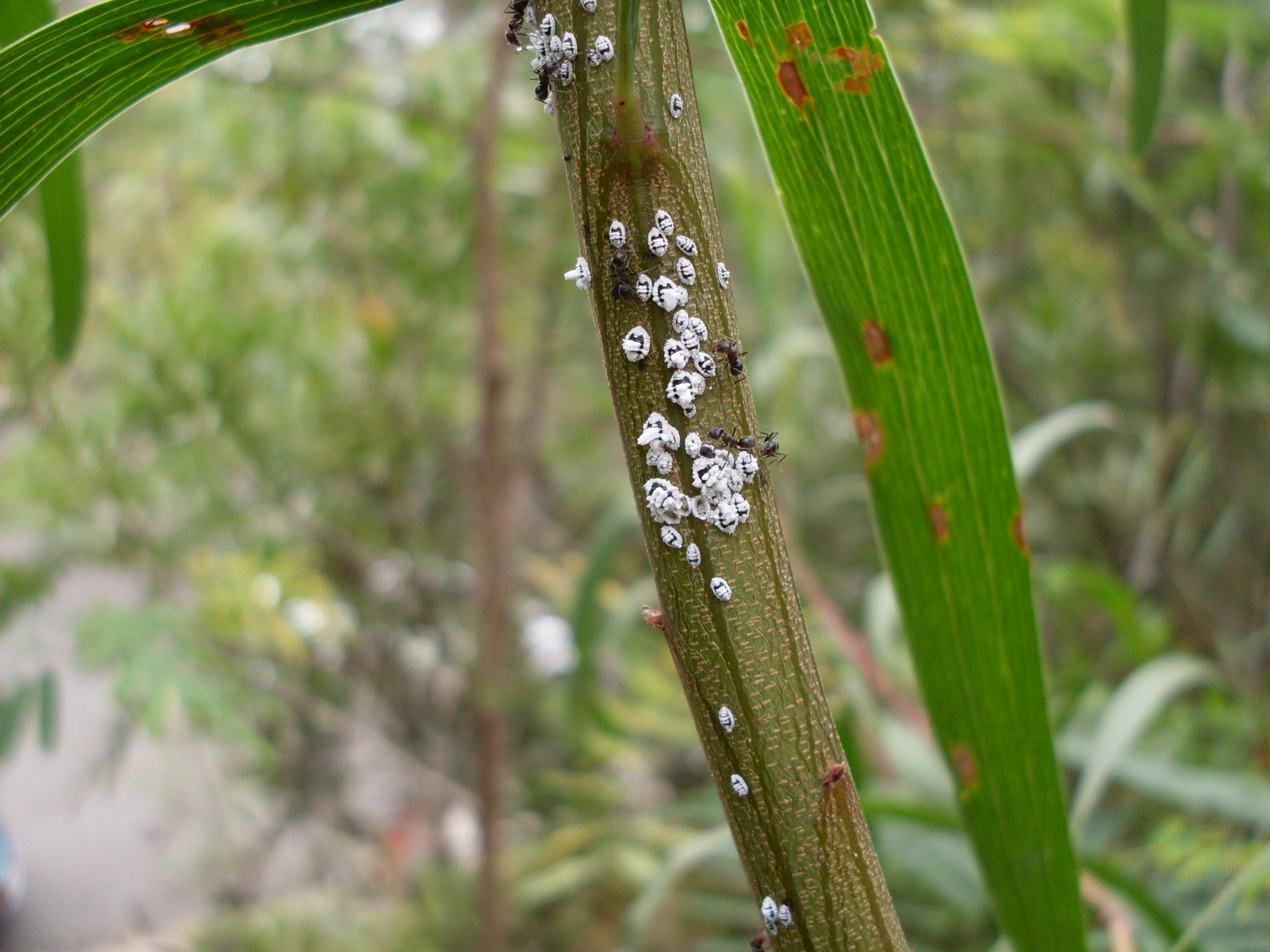
Workers harvesting honeydew from mealybugs sucking on Acacia longifolia sap

Workers forage nocturnally and diurnally, and will walk on eucalyptus trees to obtain nectar and honeydew, but they will also hunt for insects to bring back to the colony. The ant tends a variety of species of insects, such as Saisettia oleae and the aphid Aphis hederae, and they also tend to the larvae of several butterfly species, including Jalmenus daemeli, Jalmenus evagoras, Jalmenus icilius, Lucia limbaria and Ogyrus zosine. The ants have been observed foraging on flowings in the genus Leptospermum and although the species is frequently encountered in the homes of Canberra, the ant is not considered a pest.
