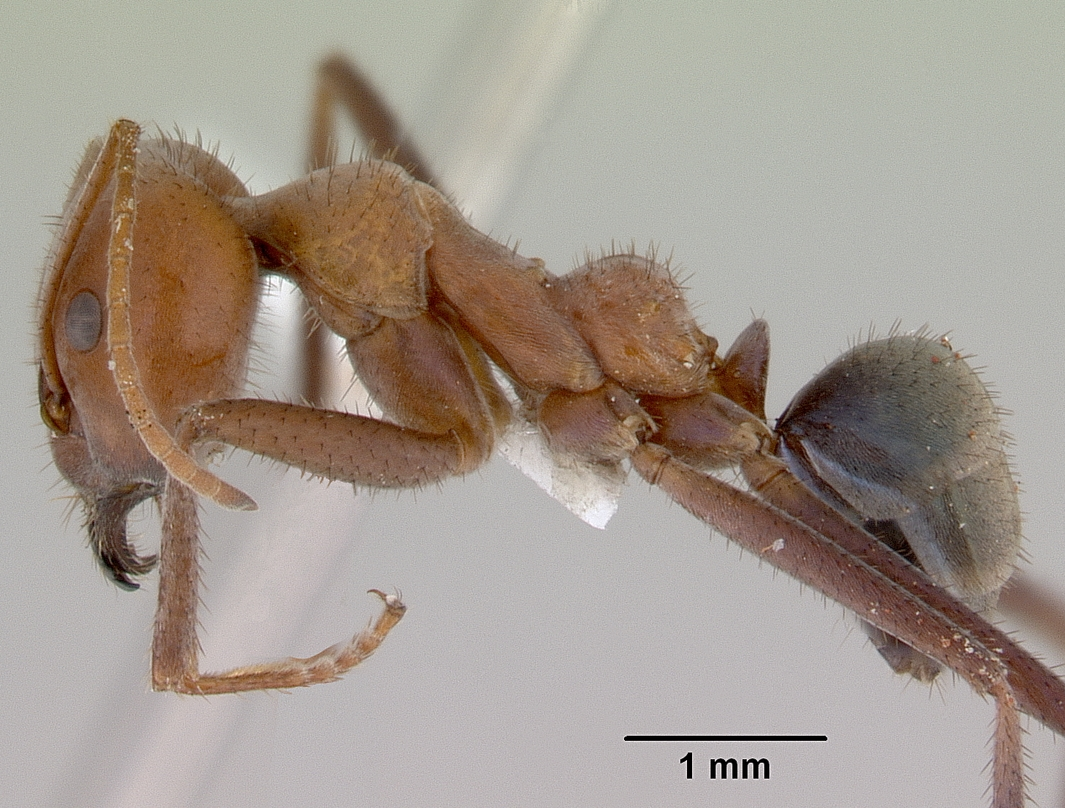

Scientific classification
- Kingdom: Animalia
- Phylum: Arthropoda
- Class: Insecta
- Order: Hymenoptera
- Family: Formicidae
- Subfamily: Dolichoderinae
- Genus: Iridomyrmex
- Species: I. reburrus

Binomial name
- Iridomyrmex reburrus Shattuck, 1993

= Iridomyrmex reburrus =

Species of ant

Iridomyrmex reburrus is a species of ant in the genus Iridomyrmex. Described by Shattuck in 1993, the species is endemic to the northern regions of Australia.
