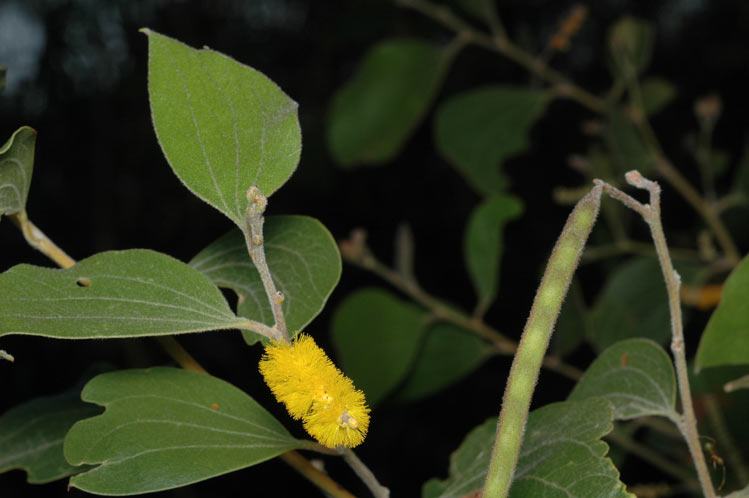
- In Kakadu National Park

Scientific classification
- Kingdom: Plantae
- Clade: Embryophytes
- Clade: Tracheophytes
- Clade: Spermatophytes
- Clade: Angiosperms
- Clade: Eudicots
- Clade: Rosids
- Order: Fabales
- Family: Fabaceae
- Subfamily: Caesalpinioideae
- Clade: Mimosoid clade
- Genus: Acacia
- Species: A. humifusa

Binomial name
- Acacia humifusa A.Cunn. ex Benth.
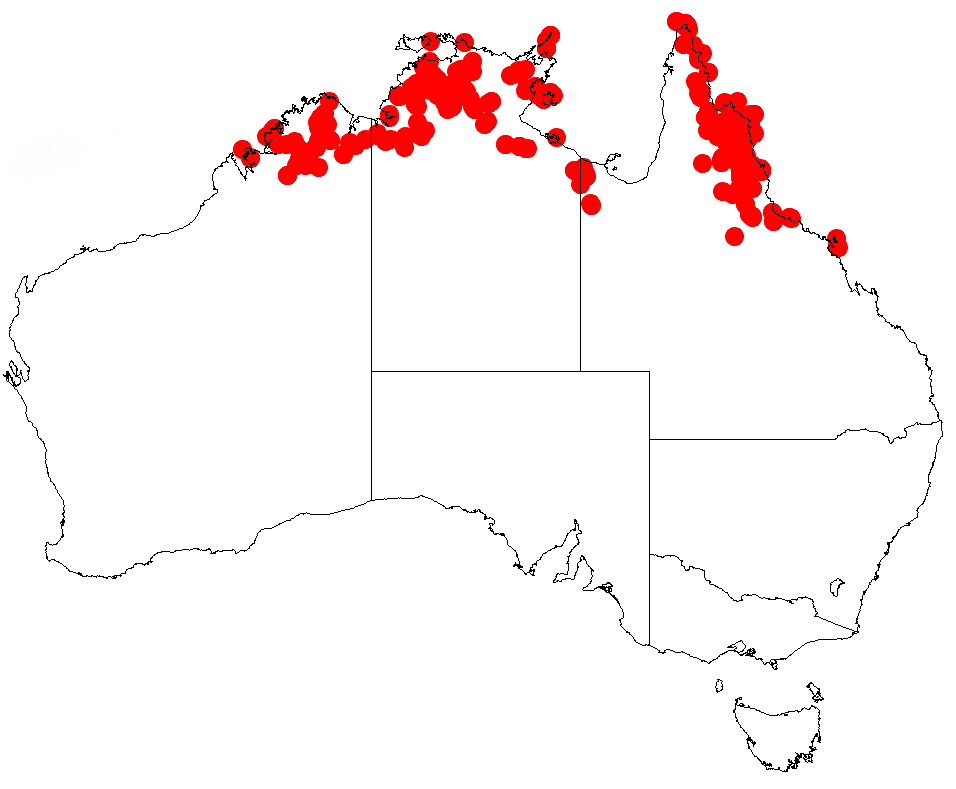
- Occurrence data from AVH

Synonyms
- Acacia dimidiata var. eriostachya F.Muell.; Racosperma humifusum (Benth.) Pedley

= Acacia humifusa =

Species of legume

Acacia humifusa is a species of flowering plant in the family Fabaceae and is endemic to northern Australia. It is an erect, spreading or prostrate shrub with fissured bark, asymmetrical obliquely egg-shaped to elliptic or almost round, leathery phyllodes, spikes of yellow flowers and linear, crusty pods.

== Description ==
Acacia humifusa is an erect, spreading or prostrate shrub that typically grows up to 3 m (9.8 ft) high, 6 m (20 ft) wide and usually has fissured bark, the branchlets more or less terete and covered with light fawn to dark brown hairs. Its phyllodes are asymmetical, obliquely egg-shaped to elliptic or almost round, 40–80 mm (1.6–3.1 in) long and 20–50 mm (0.79–1.97 in) wide with a strongly curved upper edge and a more or less straight to slightly curved lower edge. There are usually three prominent curved veins and a prominent gland near the bae of the phyllodes. The flowers are borne in one or two spikes 10–30 mm (0.39–1.18 in) long in axils on a peduncle usually up to 5 mm (0.20 in) long. Flowering occurs from January to April or June to September, and the pods are linear, straight to slightly curved, 35–75 mm (1.4–3.0 in) long and 3–5 mm (0.12–0.20 in) wide, sometimes slightly constricted between, and raised over the seeds. The seeds are broadly oblong to narrowly oblong, 43–65 mm (1.7–2.6 in) long and blackish brown.

== Taxonomy ==
Acacia humifusa was first formally described in 1842 by George Bentham in Hooker's London journal of Botany from an unpublished description by Allan Cunningham of specimens he collected near Cleveland Bay. The specific epithet (humifusa) means 'procumbent'.

== Distribution and habitat ==
This species of wattle occurs in the north of Western Australia, the north of the Northern Territory and northern Queensland. It is found in the Kimberley region of Western Australia where it is often found on rocky hilltops and slopes growing in sandy soils over quartzite or sandstone bedrock. It is also found on islands in the Gulf of Carpentaria and through the top end of the Northern Territory as well as from around Cape York in the north down to Cape Cleveland, including many of the islands.

== See also ==
- List of Acacia species
