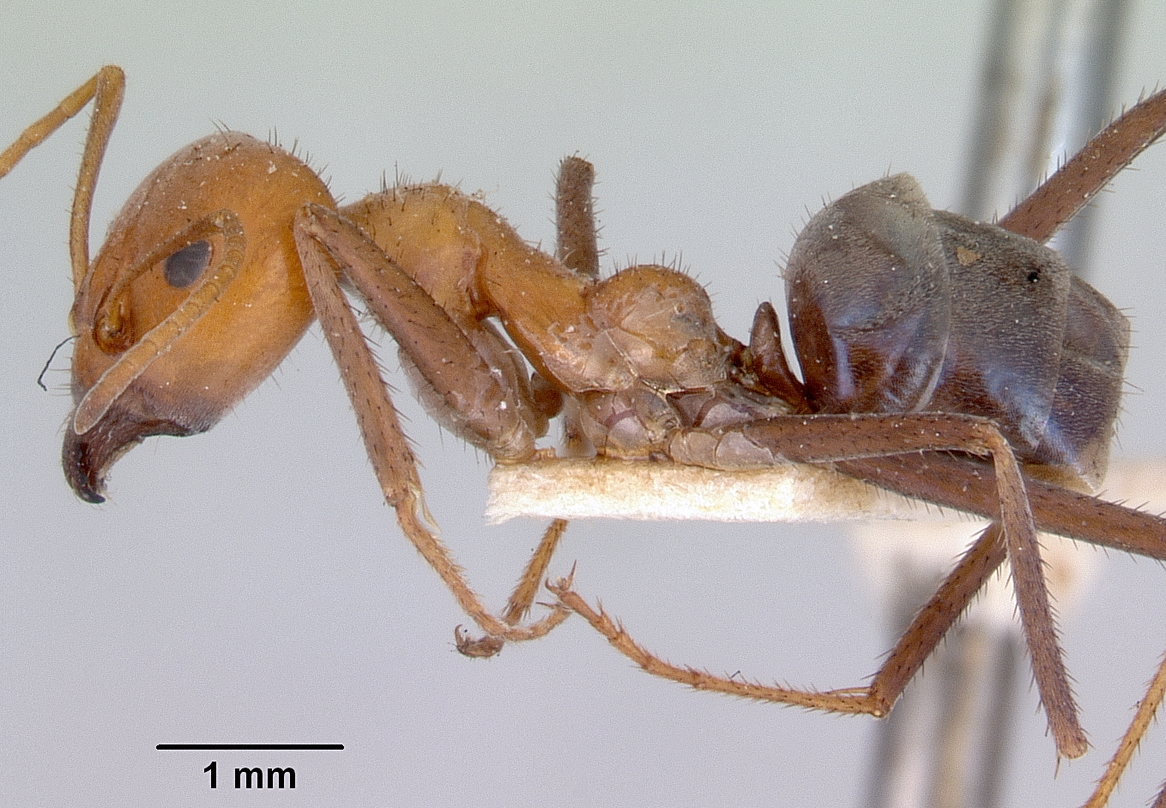

Scientific classification
- Kingdom: Animalia
- Phylum: Arthropoda
- Class: Insecta
- Order: Hymenoptera
- Family: Formicidae
- Subfamily: Dolichoderinae
- Genus: Iridomyrmex
- Species: I. sanguineus

Binomial name
- Iridomyrmex sanguineus Forel, 1910

= Iridomyrmex sanguineus =

Species of ant

Iridomyrmex sanguineus is a species of ant in the genus Iridomyrmex. The ant is endemic to Australia and was described by Auguste-Henri Forel in 1910.
