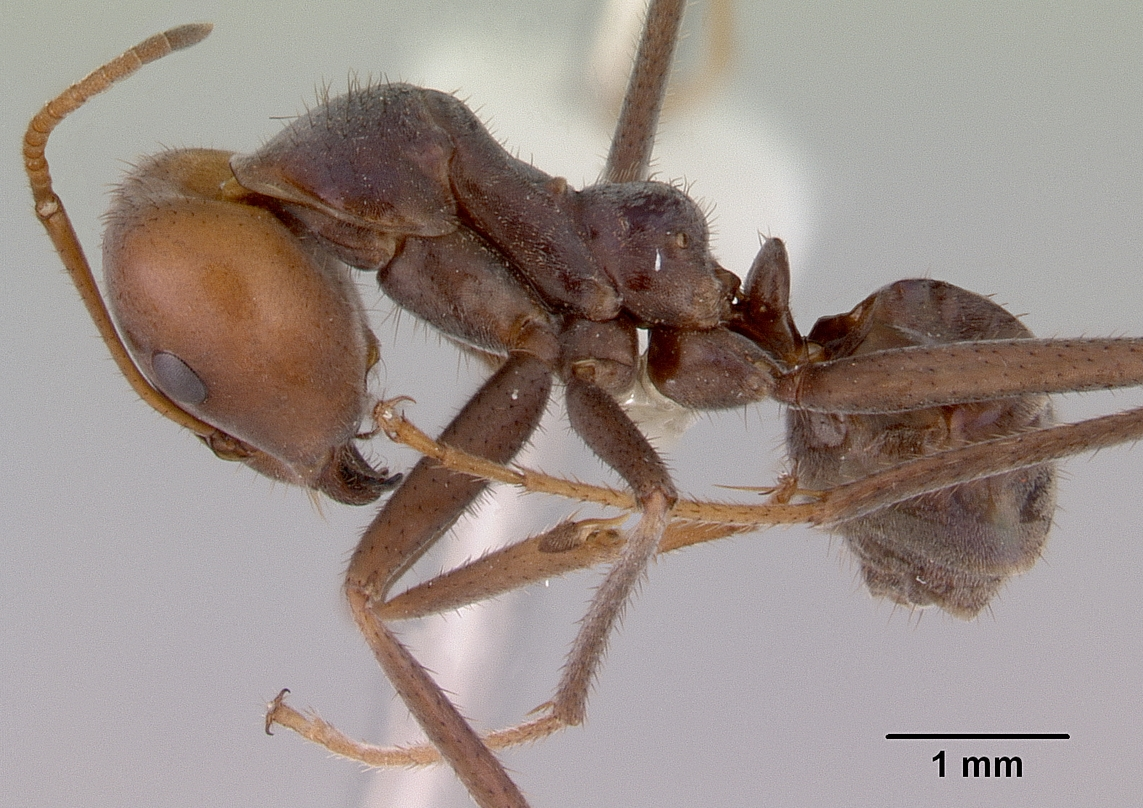

Scientific classification
- Kingdom: Animalia
- Phylum: Arthropoda
- Class: Insecta
- Order: Hymenoptera
- Family: Formicidae
- Subfamily: Dolichoderinae
- Genus: Iridomyrmex
- Species: I. spadius

Binomial name
- Iridomyrmex spadius Shattuck, 1993

= Iridomyrmex spadius =

Species of ant

Iridomyrmex spadius is a species of ant in the genus Iridomyrmex. Described by Shattuck in 1993, localised populations of the species can be found in Queensland, Australia.
