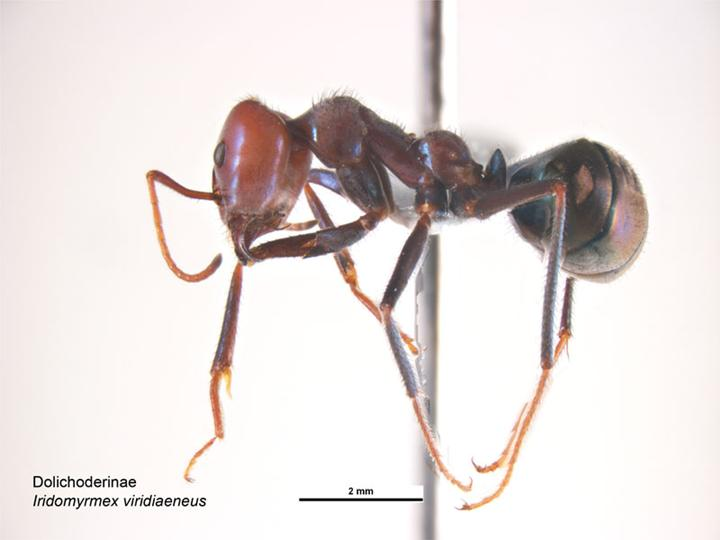

Scientific classification
- Kingdom: Animalia
- Phylum: Arthropoda
- Class: Insecta
- Order: Hymenoptera
- Family: Formicidae
- Subfamily: Dolichoderinae
- Genus: Iridomyrmex
- Species: I. viridiaeneus

Binomial name
- Iridomyrmex viridiaeneus Viehmeyer, 1914

= Iridomyrmex viridiaeneus =

Species of ant

Iridomyrmex viridiaeneus is a species of ant in the genus Iridomyrmex. Described by Viehmeyer in 1914, the species is among the most widespread species in Australia of the genus.
