= Acacia chalkeri =

Chalker's wattle

Scientific classification
- Kingdom: Plantae
- Clade: Tracheophytes
- Clade: Angiosperms
- Clade: Eudicots
- Clade: Rosids
- Order: Fabales
- Family: Fabaceae
- Subfamily: Caesalpinioideae
- Clade: Mimosoid clade
- Genus: Acacia
- Species: A. chalkeri

Binomial name
- Acacia chalkeri Maiden
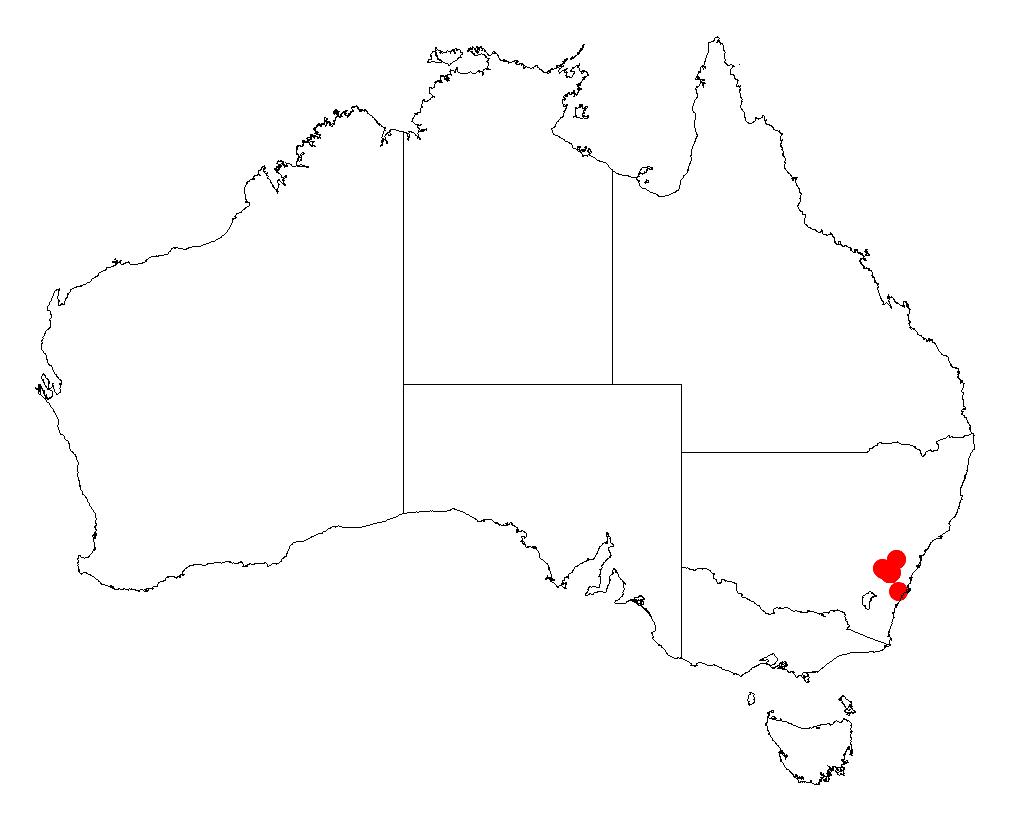
- Occurrence data from AVH

Synonyms
- Racosperma chalkeri (Maiden) Pedley

Species of legume

Acacia chalkeri, also known as Chalker's wattle, is a species of flowering plant in the family Fabaceae and is endemic to New South Wales, Australia. It is an erect or spreading, bushy shrub with lance-shaped to narrowly lance-shaped phyllodes with the narrower end towards the base, spherical heads of bright yellow flowers and linear, firmly papery pods.

== Description ==
Acacia chalkeri is an erect or spreading, bushy shrub that typically grows to a height of up to 3 m (9.8 ft) and has angled reddish brown branchlets. Its phyllodes are lance-shaped to narrowly lance-shaped with the narrower end towards the base, 25–55 mm (0.98–2.17 in) long and mostly 3–10 mm (0.12–0.39 in) wide with a fine but distinct midrib. The flowers are borne in six to eight spherical heads in racemes 10–20 mm (0.39–0.79 in) long on peduncles 3–5 mm (0.12–0.20 in) long. Each head has 15 to 25 bright yellow flowers. Flowering mainly occurs between October and January and the seed pods that form after flowering are linear, firmly papery, up to 90 mm (3.5 in) long and 5–7 mm (0.20–0.28 in) wide. The seeds are slightly shiny and black, oblong to elliptic, 4–5 mm (0.16–0.20 in) wide with a thick aril.

== Taxonomy ==
Acacia chalkeri was first formally described in 1915 by the botanist Joseph Maiden in the Journal and Proceedings of the Royal Society of New South Wales. The specific epithet honours Thomas Michael Chalker who worked as a caretaker at Wombeyan Caves.

== Distribution and habitat ==
This species of wattle is restricted to limestone soils and is found near the Wombeyan Caves area in south western New South Wales, as a part of dry open woodland and sclerophyll forest communities.

== See also ==
- List of Acacia species
