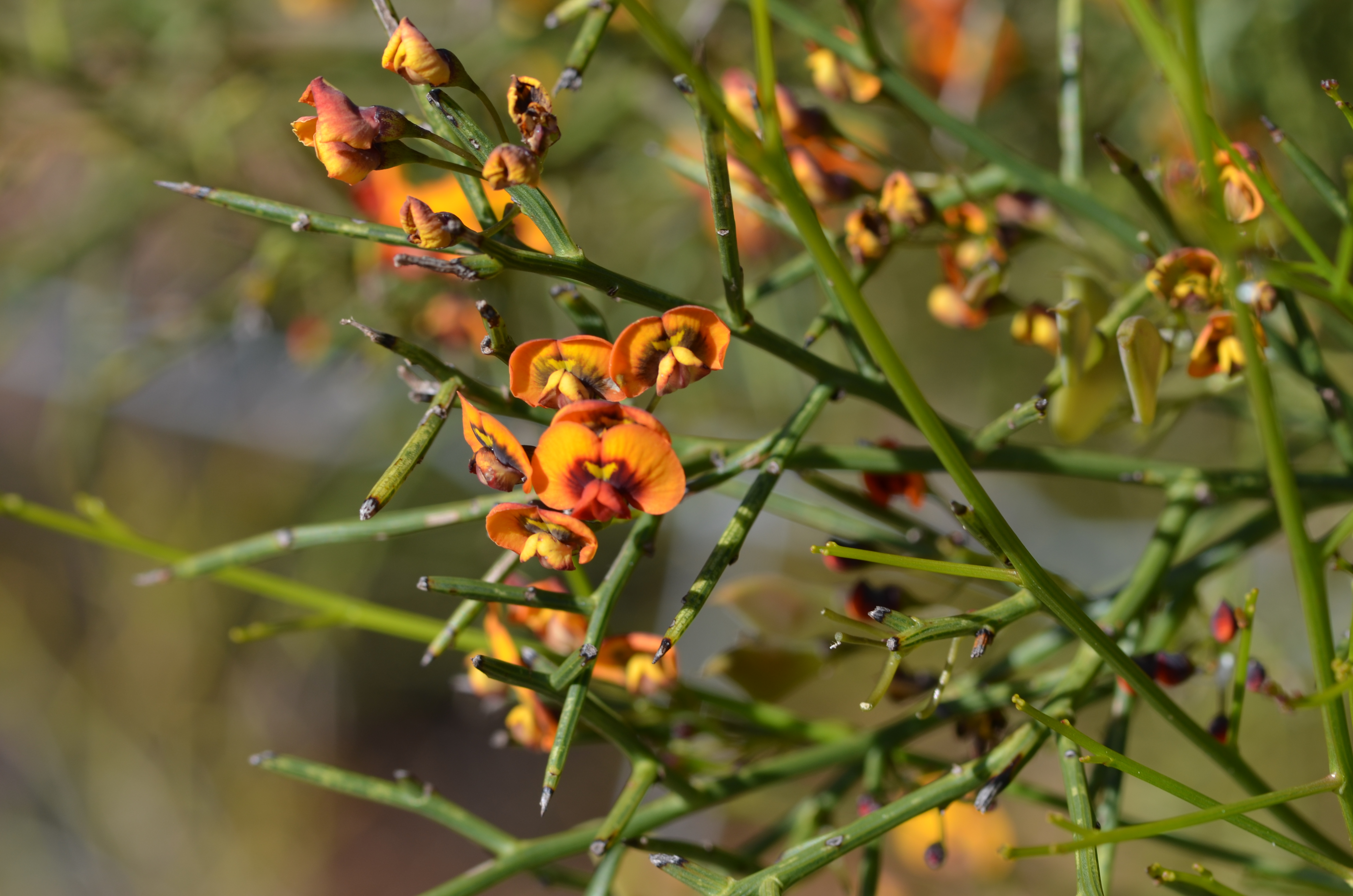
- Daviesia divaricata in the Kensington Bushland Reserve

Scientific classification
- Kingdom: Plantae
- Clade: Tracheophytes
- Clade: Angiosperms
- Clade: Eudicots
- Clade: Rosids
- Order: Fabales
- Family: Fabaceae
- Subfamily: Faboideae
- Genus: Daviesia
- Species: D. divaricata

Binomial name
- Daviesia divaricata Benth.
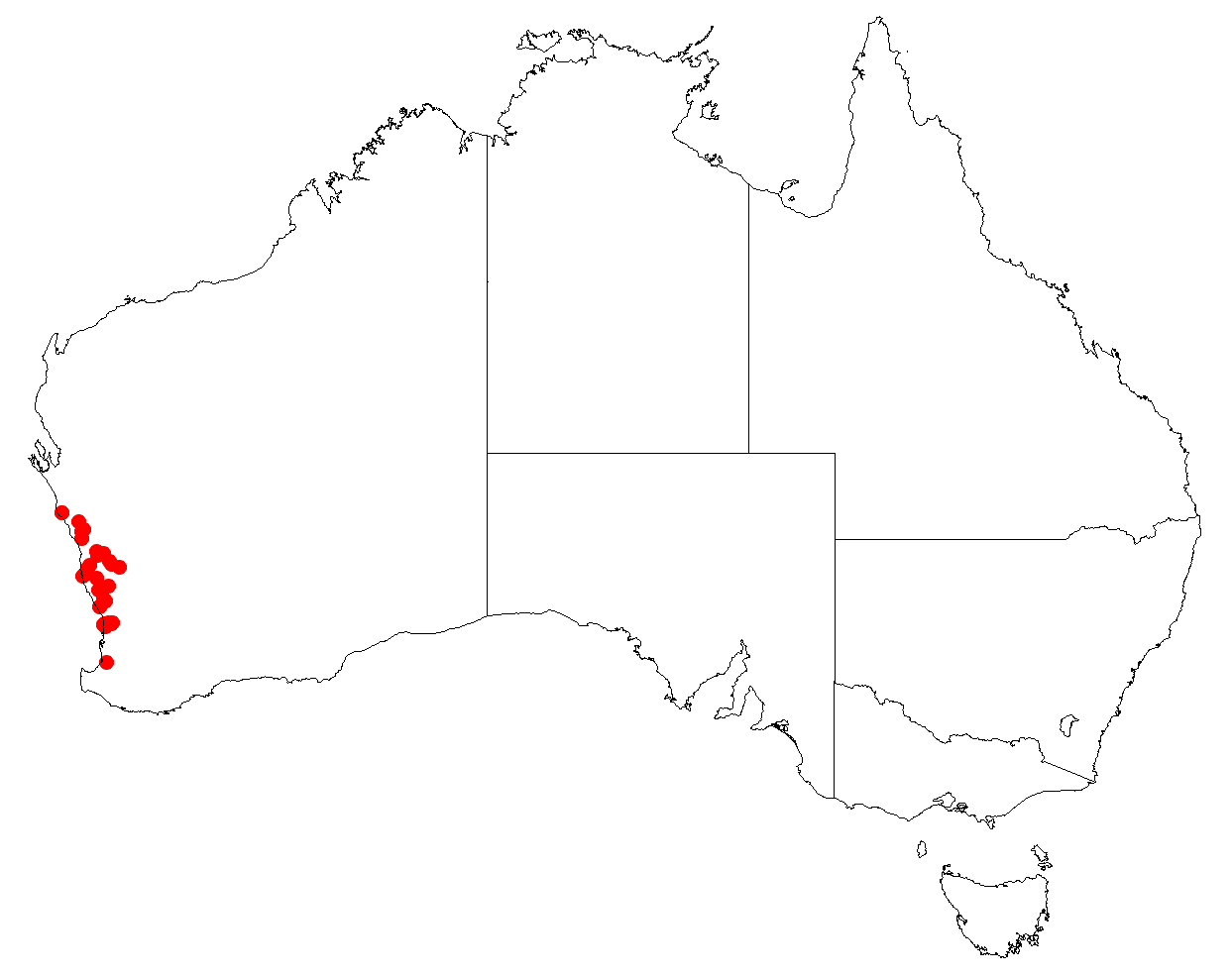
- Occurrence data from AVH

Synonyms
- Daviesia pedunculata Benth.

= Daviesia divaricata =

Marno

Species of legume

Daviesia divaricata, commonly known as marno, is a species of flowering plant in the family Fabaceae and is endemic to the south-west of Western Australia. It is a low, spreading or erect and bushy shrub with phyllodes reduced to small, triangular scales, and orange and maroon flowers.

== Description ==
Daviesia divaricata is a low, spreading or erect and bushy shrub that typically grows to a height of 0.3–3 m (1 ft 0 in – 9 ft 10 in) and is mostly glabrous. Its phyllodes are reduced to keeled, triangular scales about 1 mm (0.039 in) long. The flowers are arranged in groups of up to six in leaf axils on a peduncle 1–3 mm (0.039–0.118 in) long, the rachis up to 3 mm (0.12 in), each flower on a pedicel 2–4.5 mm (0.079–0.177 in) long with bracts about 1 mm (0.039 in) long. The sepals are 4.0–4.5 mm (0.16–0.18 in) long and have five ribs, the lobes varying with subspecies. The standard petal is egg-shaped, 6.5–8.5 mm (0.26–0.33 in) long, 8–10 mm (0.31–0.39 in) wide and deep orange with a maroon base and a deeply notched tip. The wings are 5–7 mm (0.20–0.28 in) long and maroon, and the keel is 5–6 mm (0.20–0.24 in) long and maroon. Flowering occurs from May to early November and the fruit is a triangular pod 11–16 mm (0.43–0.63 in) long.

== Taxonomy ==
Daviesia divaricata was first formally described in 1837 by botanist George Bentham in Stephan Endlicher's Enumeratio plantarum quas in Novae Hollandiae ora austro-occidentali ad fluvium Cygnorum et in sinu Regis Georgii collegit Carolus Liber Baro de Hügel. The specific epithet (divaricata) means "widely spreading".

In 2017, Michael Crisp and Gregory T. Chandler described two subspecies in Phytotaxa, and the names are accepted by the Australian Plant Census:

- Daviesia divaricata Benth. subsp. divaricata has the upper two sepals joined, forming a lip about 0.25–0.5 mm (0.0098–0.0197 in) long and the lower lobes triangular;
- Daviesia divaricata subsp. lanulosa Crisp & G.Chandler has sepal lobes about 0.75 mm (0.030 in) long with woolly hairs inside.

== Distribution and habitat ==
Marno grows on sand, over both limestone and laterite in near-coastal sandplains and dunes from near the Hutt River to near Busselton. Subspecies lanulosa replaces the autonym in the north and occurs from near Walkaway to the Murchison River.

== Conservation status ==
Both subspecies of Daviesia divaricata are classified as "not threatened" by the Western Australian Government Department of Biodiversity, Conservation and Attractions.
