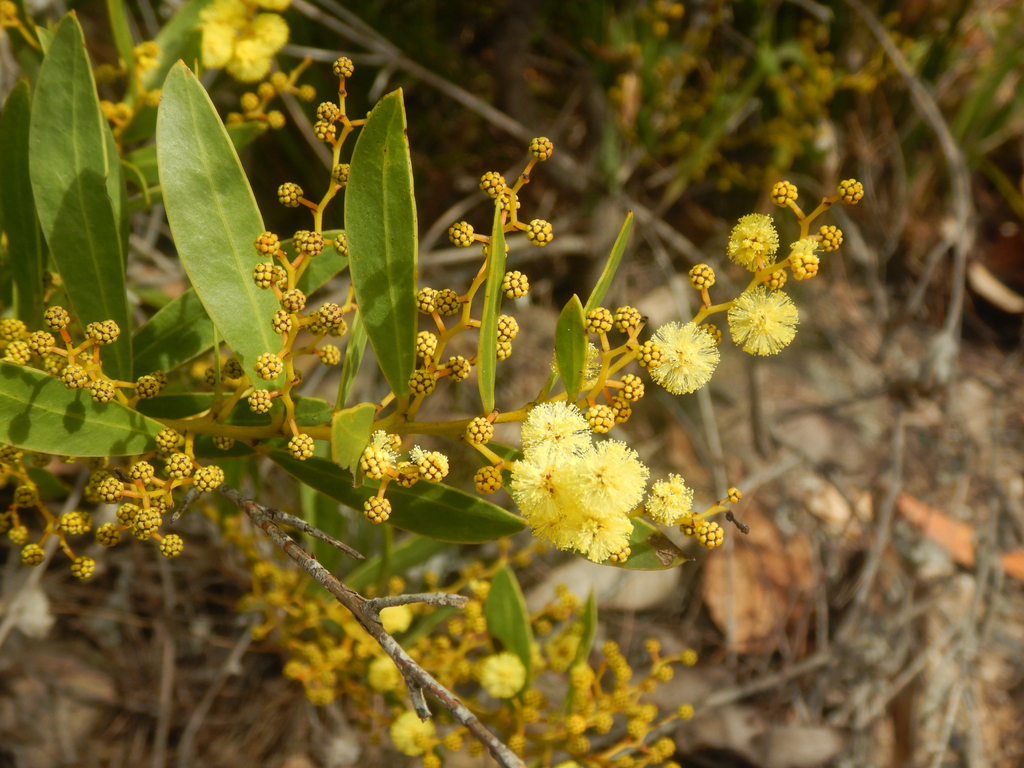
- Near Wadbilliga

Scientific classification
- Kingdom: Plantae
- Clade: Embryophytes
- Clade: Tracheophytes
- Clade: Spermatophytes
- Clade: Angiosperms
- Clade: Eudicots
- Clade: Rosids
- Order: Fabales
- Family: Fabaceae
- Subfamily: Caesalpinioideae
- Clade: Mimosoid clade
- Genus: Acacia
- Species: A. kydrensis

Binomial name
- Acacia kydrensis Tindale
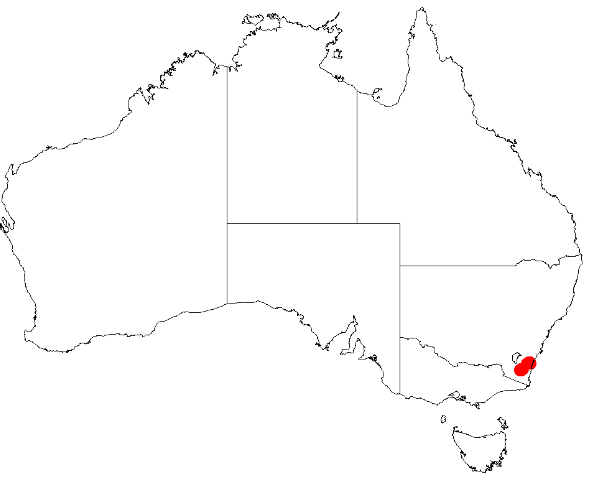
- Occurrence data from AVH

Synonyms
- Racosperma kydrense (Tindale) Pedley

= Acacia kydrensis =

Kydra wattle

Species of legume

Acacia kydrensis, commonly known as Kydra wattle, is a species of flowering plant in the family Fabaceae and is endemic to a small area in the south of New South Wales, Australia. It is a shrub with many stems, glabrous, reddish brown branchlets, lance-shaped to narrowly lance-shaped phyllodes with the narrower end towards the base, spherical heads of yellow flowers and linear to narrowly oblong, firmly leathery, glabrous pods.

== Description ==
Acacia kydrensis is a shrub that typically grows to a height of 1–2 m (3 ft 3 in – 6 ft 7 in) with many stems and glabrous red-brown branchlets. Its phyllodes are ascending to erect, lance-shaped to narrowly lance-shaped with the narrower end towards the base, 30–60 mm (1.2–2.4 in) long, 9–14 mm (0.35–0.55 in) wide, thick, glabrous and leathery with the edge veins prominent and sometimes up to three glands up to 5 mm (0.20 in) above the pulvinus. The flowers are borne in spherical heads in racemes 10–25 mm (0.39–0.98 in) long on peduncles 1.5–3 mm (0.059–0.118 in) long, each head with 15 to 24 yellow flowers. Flowering mostly occurs between September and November, and the pods are linear to narrowly oblong, up to 80 mm (3.1 in) long, 5–8 mm (0.20–0.31 in) wide and dark brown to black, glabrous and firmly papery. The seeds are 4.0–4.5 mm (0.16–0.18 in), dull or slightly shiny black with a club-shaped aril.

== Taxonomy ==
Acacia kydrensis was first formally described in 1980 by Mary Tindale in the journal Telopea, from specimens collected at Kydra reefs 25 km (16 mi) south-east of Cooma by Roger Coveny.

== Distribution and habitat ==
Kydra wattle grows in forest and shrubland on a variety of substrates, mainly in the Kydra reef area south-east of Cooma, but also in Deua and Wadbilliga National Parks of south-eastern New South Wales.

== See also ==
- List of Acacia species
