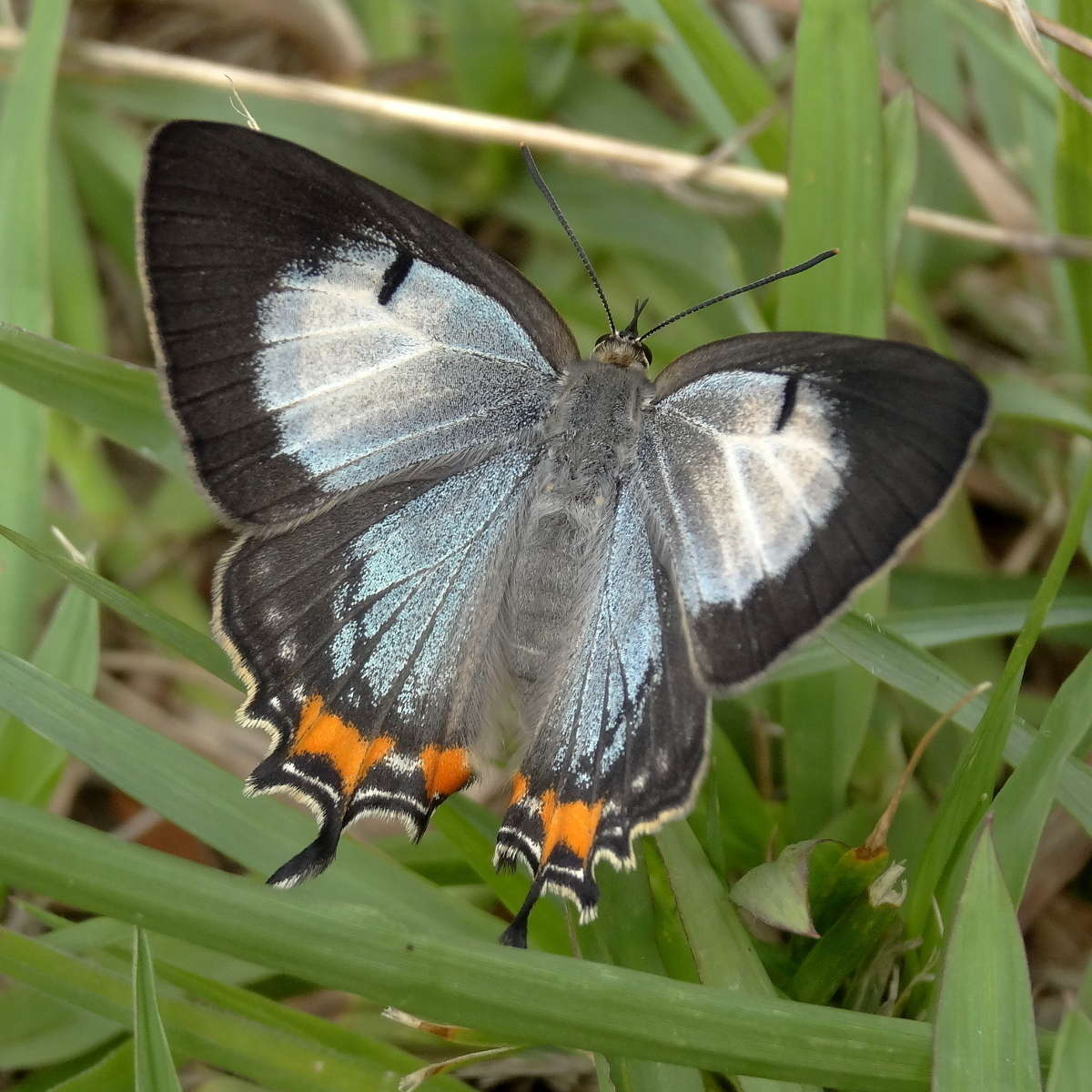
- Dorsal view
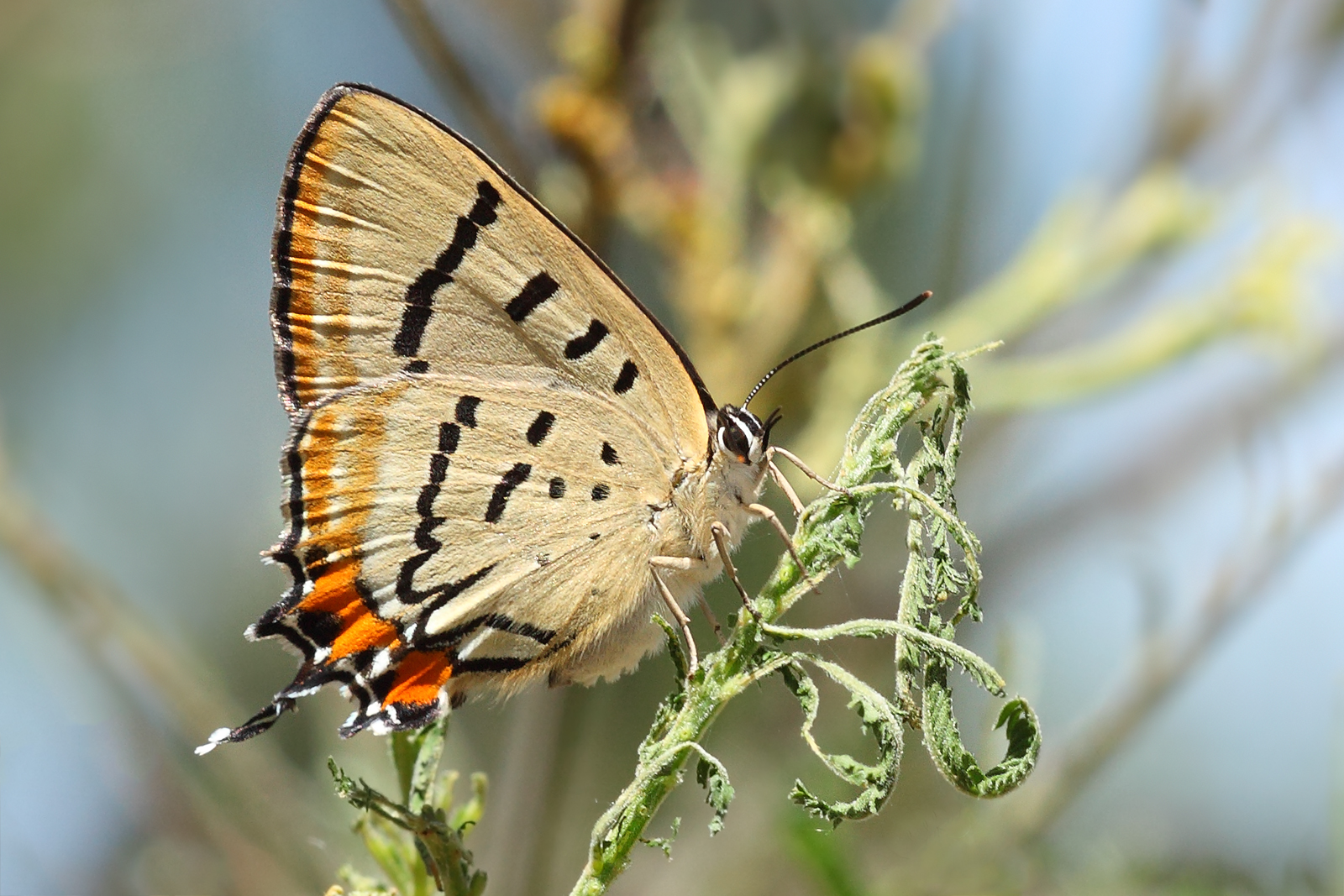
- Ventral view

Scientific classification
- Kingdom: Animalia
- Phylum: Arthropoda
- Class: Insecta
- Order: Lepidoptera
- Family: Lycaenidae
- Tribe: Zesiini
- Genus: Jalmenus
- Species: J. evagoras

Binomial name
- Jalmenus evagoras (Donovan, 1805)

Synonyms
- Papilio evagoras Donovan, 1805; Polyommatus celestis Drapiez, 1819

= Jalmenus evagoras =

Species of butterfly

Jalmenus evagoras, the imperial hairstreak, imperial blue, or common imperial blue, is a small, metallic blue butterfly of the family Lycaenidae. It is commonly found in eastern coastal regions of Australia. This species is notable for its unique mutualism with ants of the genus Iridomyrmex. The ants provide protection for juveniles and cues for adult mating behavior. They are compensated with food secreted from J. evagoras larvae. The ants greatly enhance the survival and reproductive success of the butterflies. J. evagoras lives and feeds on Acacia plants, so butterfly populations are localized to areas with preferred species of both host plants and ants.

== Description ==
The wings of Jalmenus evagoras are metallic blue outlined with black. The hindwings have tails and orange spots towards the bottom. On the ventral side, wings are buff-coloured with black streaks and orange hindwing spots similar to the dorsal side. The butterfly has a maximum wingspan of 4 cm.

Little to no sexual dimorphism is observed between male and female adult butterflies. In the pupal stage, females can be up to 60% larger than males.

== Range ==
Jalmenus evagoras lives along the east coast of Australia in Queensland, New South Wales, Victoria, and the Australian Capital Territory. Populations of this butterfly are distributed sporadically throughout this range, which is due in part to its need for nitrogen-rich host plants and specific species of attendant ants belonging to the genus Iridomyrmex. The necessary food plants are continuously distributed, but not all meet J. evagoras' nutritional needs for its mutualism with ants or coincide with colonies of the ants. The butterflies live in small demes, or breeding populations, over limited areas which may consist of no more than one tree. They have a high level of site fidelity, meaning that the majority of butterflies are found in the same place almost every day of their adult lives. J. evagoras is a multivoltine species, so they have multiple breeding cycles in a year. Two of these broods are generally located in the southern part of their range and three or four broods in the northern part.

== Food resources ==
=== Larvae ===
Larvae feed on more than twenty-five species of plants from the genus Acacia. Their specialized exocrine glands then secrete food for attendant ants as a reward for their protection from predators and parasitoids. These secretions are composed of carbohydrates and amino acids. Dependence on ants causes the butterflies to select host plants that fulfill these nutritional requirements. In particular, the choice of nitrogen-fixing and other protein-rich host plants is correlated with higher attendance of ants to the butterfly larvae. Protein acquired from consuming the plants allows J. evagoras larvae to produce sufficient amino acid secretions to sustain their mutualism with the ants.

=== Adults ===
J. evagoras adult females can increase both their fecundity and longevity by feeding on flowers with a higher concentration of sugar in their nectar. Higher sugar levels can increase a female butterfly's lifespan from four to twenty-eight days and allow her to lay up to three times as many eggs. The presence of sugar and amino acids both stimulate females to feed more frequently, but amino acids do not affect fecundity or longevity.

== Parental care ==
=== Oviposition ===
Female J. evagoras typically oviposit in holes in the bark of Acacia trees. The trunk of the tree is the most common location, but some also lay eggs on leaves. Female butterflies were observed changing their oviposition sites over the course of the egg laying season from the outside of plants to the inside of trunk crevices. The decision of where to lay eggs is influenced by a set of hierarchical cues. This includes the species and nutritional attributes of the host plant as well as the presence or absence of ants and conspecific larvae.

=== Host plant selection ===
A major factor in host plant selection is the presence of attendant ants. Female butterflies are more likely to oviposit on plants with ants. They can also tell the difference between different species of ants and identify the ones that are better suited to protect their young. The presence of other larvae can also influence oviposition, but this is a secondary effect of the larvae attracting more ants to the host plant. Females can also sense the nutritional quality of the plant, such as the nitrogen and water content in the leaves. Possible cues for this include the colour of the leaf (darker green indicating higher nutritive value) and taste, once she has landed on the plant. A combination of sensory cues are taken into consideration by the female butterfly before and after landing on the host plant to ensure that her eggs have an optimal chance of survival in the location she chooses.

In Queensland, females tended towards younger Acacia trees for oviposition. In other locations, juveniles were discovered on older trees at a higher frequency. Larvae show a preference for terminal foliage in all host plant sizes.

== Social behavior ==
=== Juvenile sociality ===
The juveniles of J. evagoras are gregarious and exhibit aggregation behavior. Eggs are laid in clusters, and then larvae and pupae remain close together even after hatching. Young larvae in particular tend to aggregate more often in the presence of attendant ants, while older larvae are generally not influenced by the ants. However, fifth instars may decide to pupate near other individuals if there is a low density of ants on the host plant. Larvae can use trails of ant pheromones to locate conspecific juveniles. Other cues such as stridulation and larval silk trails are also possible factors in aggregation behavior.

== Life cycle ==
=== In nature ===
Adult J. evagoras are in flight from late October or November until April. Near Sydney, immature butterflies are most commonly seen in October and early February. The egg stage overwinters, so eggs laid near the end of the season will remain dormant until they hatch in the spring. If eggs are laid in the spring, they hatch quickly and reproduce in the next two months.

=== In the lab ===
Larval development in the lab takes an average of four weeks at 28 °C. The presence of attendant ants can decrease development time by up to five days. Once the larvae pupate, they are still tended by ants, but it has not been shown to speed up development time in this stage. The duration of the pupal stage is about seven days.

== Enemies ==
=== Predators ===
The main predators of J. evagoras larvae are other arthropods such as vespid wasps, predatory ponerine ants, reduviid bugs, and spiders. Predation from these insects significantly declines when ant guards are present in larval populations. Adult butterflies are occasionally eaten by vertebrates such as birds, but juvenile mortality is not affected by these predators.

=== Parasites ===
J. evagoras is frequently parasitized by species of wasps in different stages of development. trichogrammatid wasps are egg parasites.Braconid wasps are among the main parasitoids in the larval stage, attacking early instars and kills juveniles upon emergence from the fourth instar larva. Chalcidid wasps parasitize pupae, attacking at the prepupal stage and eclosing from the pupae. The presence of attendant ants has been shown to protect against the braconids and the trichogrammatids in certain sites, but it does not decrease the parasitism of chalcidid wasps.

== Mating ==
=== Mate searching behavior ===
Adult males search for mates by investigating the clusters of larvae clumped together on the branches of Acacia host plants. Jalmenus evagoras exhibits protandry, which means that the males emerge before the females. In an effort to find mates, they regularly patrol trees containing pupae, taking into account the fact that healthy larvae and pupae are found in areas with attending ants. Because healthy juvenile butterflies live amongst the ants, males that learn this cue find suitable females before they mature, cutting down on both male time and energy costs. Males hover around the juveniles, often using their antennae as a tool to taste for the age and sex of the larvae.

Males are sexually indiscriminate in mate searching, often resulting in attempted copulations with eclosing males. Female pupae are generally a bit larger than male pupae so size could in fact be used as an indicator of sex to avoid mistaken copulations. However, male Jalmenus evagoras do not depend on size and there is no evidence that they land on the bigger pupae, just the pupae that are tended to by more attendant ants. This shows the importance of the presence or absence of ants as a major factor in mate selection.

=== Female/male interactions ===
A mating ball is subsequently formed as up to thirty males scramble to the site of an eclosing pupa that is just about to emerge as an adult. This competitive aggregation of males around the pupa is termed the explosive mating strategy. After a female emerges, copulation takes place right away, usually before she has a chance to let her wings harden and expand.

Males are not territorial and will readily leave one host plant to join another mating ball. In addition, males mate multiple times, and if they are successful, have been observed to mate as many as seven times in their lifetime. The three components of male lifetime mating success are longevity, encounter rate, and mating efficiency.

Female Jalmenus evagoras are monogamous. In experimentation it has been observed that females appear at a given site for shorter periods of time than males, although it is unknown if this is because females have a shorter life span or simply that they have emigrated out more. The shorter-life-span hypothesis is plausible given the fact that female Jalmenus evagoras are monogamous and do not necessarily need to live longer to mate with multiple mates.

== Mutualism ==
=== With ants ===
Jalmenus evagoras exhibit mutualism with worker ants of the genus Iridomyrmex. They most commonly associate with Iridomyrmex anceps and Iridomyrmex rufoniger, though they may also affiliate with several other species. Attendant ants protect J. evagoras juveniles from predators and parasitoids and are rewarded with food secretions from the larvae or pupae. Populations of larvae with attendant ants have higher chances of survival than those without ants. Mutualism with ants is also a key component of the J. evagoras mating system. Female butterflies use the presence or absence of ants for oviposition, and males use them to locate healthy pupae for mating.

==== Ant-associated adaptations ====
Larvae and pupae have specialized adaptations for their mutualism with ants. Larvae have a thick cuticle to protect internal organs from ant bites. Pupae and larvae have two kinds of external organs used for secreting the ants' food rewards – perforated cupola organs (PCOs) and dorsal nectary organs (DNOs). Both of these contain the glands that secrete substances for ants to consume. In addition to glandular organs, juveniles also have stridulatory organs that produce sounds for communicating with ants. Stridulation by late instar larvae and pupae allows ants to locate them more easily.

== Gallery ==
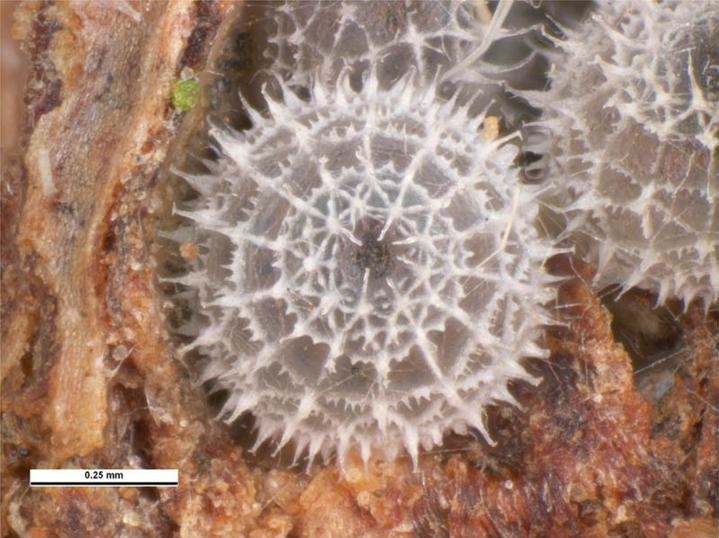
Egg

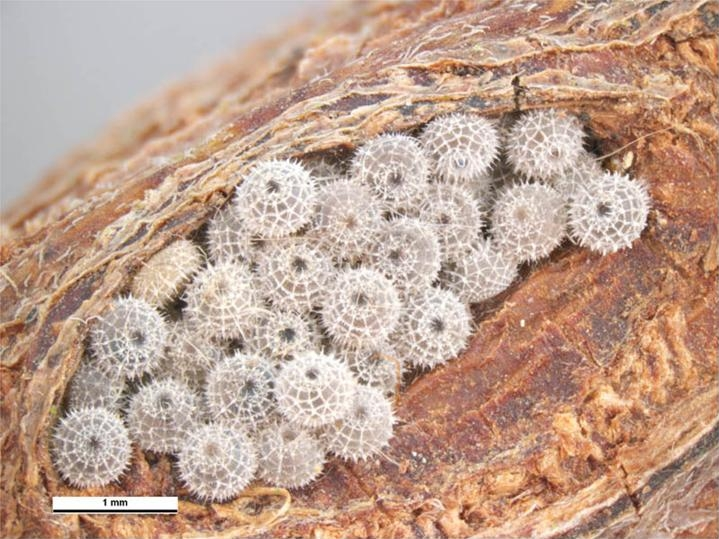
Eggs

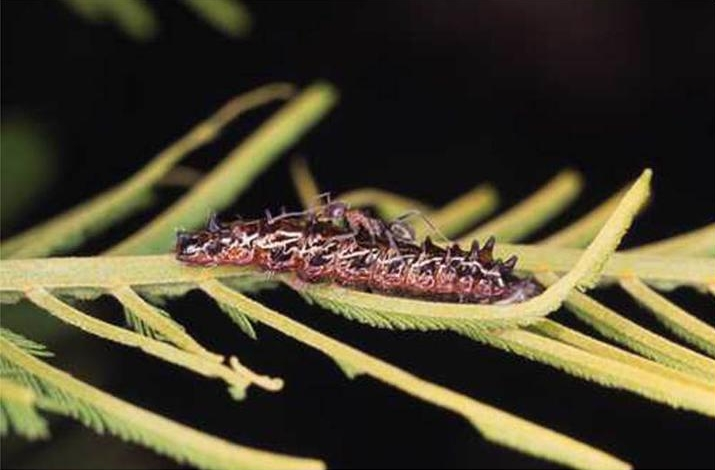
Larva

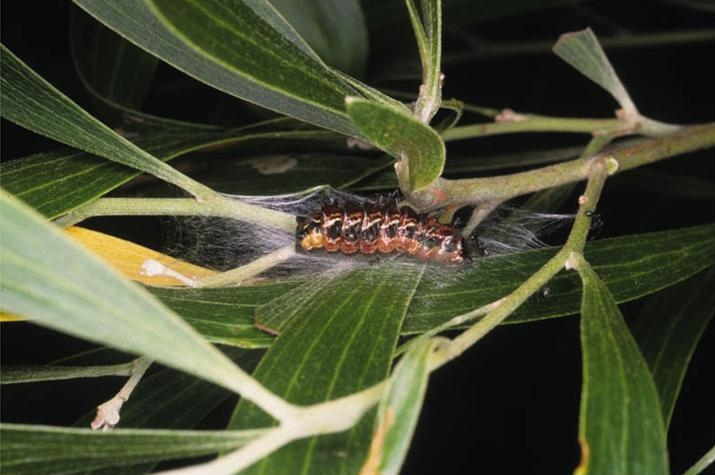
Pre-pupa

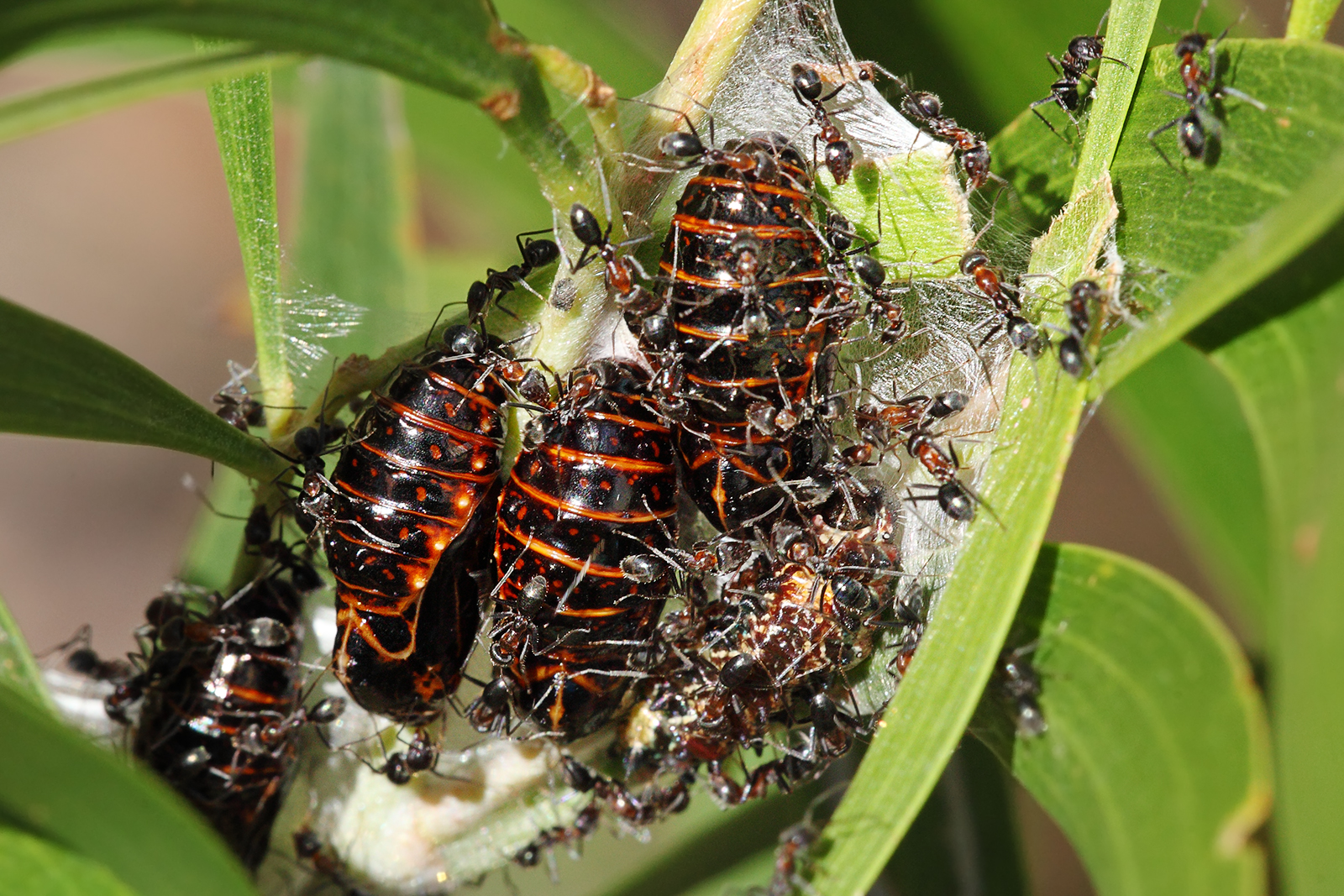
Pupae tended by ants

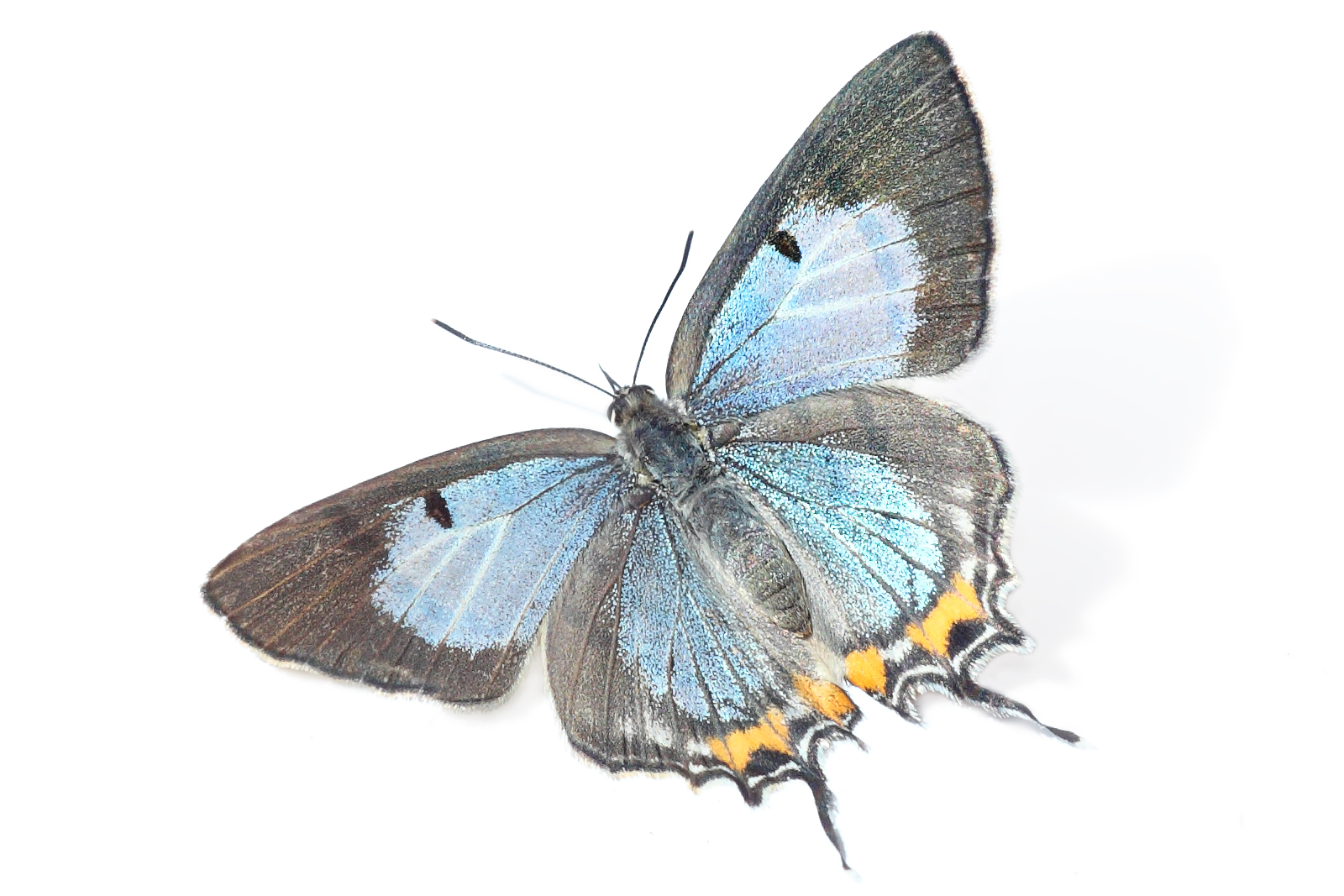
Dorsal view

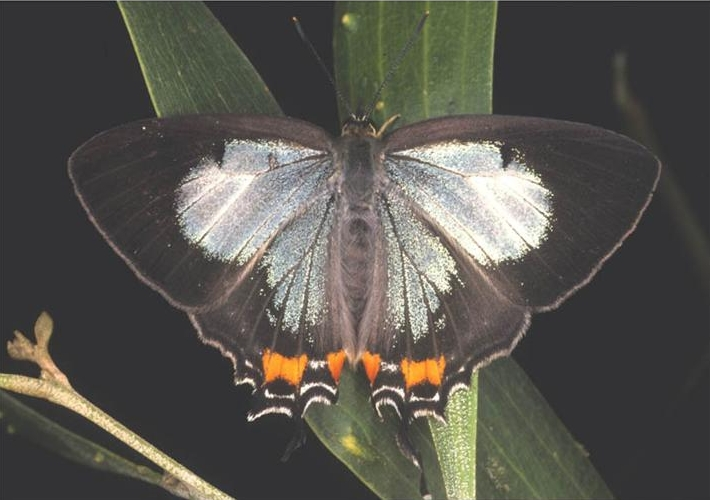
Female

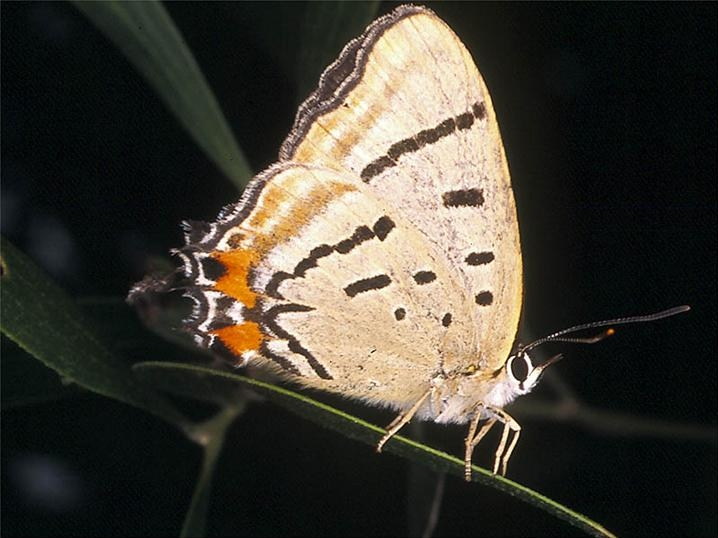
Male
