= Daviesia benthamii =

Scientific classification
- Kingdom: Plantae
- Clade: Tracheophytes
- Clade: Angiosperms
- Clade: Eudicots
- Clade: Rosids
- Order: Fabales
- Family: Fabaceae
- Subfamily: Faboideae
- Genus: Daviesia
- Species: D. benthamii

Binomial name
- Daviesia benthamii Meisn.

Synonyms
- Daviesia benthamii Meisn. subsp. benthamii; Daviesia incrassata var. benthamii (Meisn.) Domin

Species of flowering plant

Daviesia benthamii is a species of flowering plant in the family Fabaceae and is endemic to the west of Western Australia. It is an erect, bushy shrub with scattered, cylindrical, sharply pointed phyllodes, and yellow-orange and reddish-brown flowers.

== Description ==
Daviesia benthamii is an erect, bushy shrub that typically grows to a height of 0.5–1 m (1 ft 8 in – 3 ft 3 in) and has smooth, rigid branchlets. Its leaves are reduced to scattered, cylindrical, sharply-pointed phyllodes, 10–80 mm (0.39–3.15 in) long and 0.8–1.8 mm (0.031–0.071 in) wide. The flowers are arranged in groups of up to five in leaf axils on a peduncle 0.5–4 mm (0.020–0.157 in) long, each flower on a pedicel 1–7 mm (0.039–0.276 in) long with oblong bracts 0.5–1 mm (0.020–0.039 in) long at the base. The sepals are 2.5–3.5 mm (0.098–0.138 in) long, the standard petal yellow with a red base and about 7 mm (0.28 in) long, the wings orange-yellow with dull brown markings and 4.5–5.0 mm (0.18–0.20 in) long, the keel dull red and about 4 mm (0.16 in) long. Flowering occurs from July to September and the fruit is a flattened broadly egg-shaped or triangular pod 5–7 mm (0.20–0.28 in) long.

== Taxonomy and naming ==
Daviesia benthamii was first formally described in 1844 by Carl Meissner in Lehmann's Plantae Preissianae from specimens collected at the Swan River by James Drummond. The specific epithet (benthamii) honours George Bentham.

== Distribution and habitat ==
This species of pea grows in mallee, woodland and shrubland and occurs from the Ningaloo Coast to the Darling Range in the south to Merredin in the east, in the Avon Wheatbelt, Carnarvon, Coolgardie, Esperance Plains, Geraldton Sandplains, Jarrah Forest, Mallee, Swan Coastal Plain and Yalgoo biogeographic regions in the west of Western Australia.

== Conservation status ==
Daviesia benthamii is classified as "not threatened" by the Government of Western Australia Department of Biodiversity, Conservation and Attractions.
