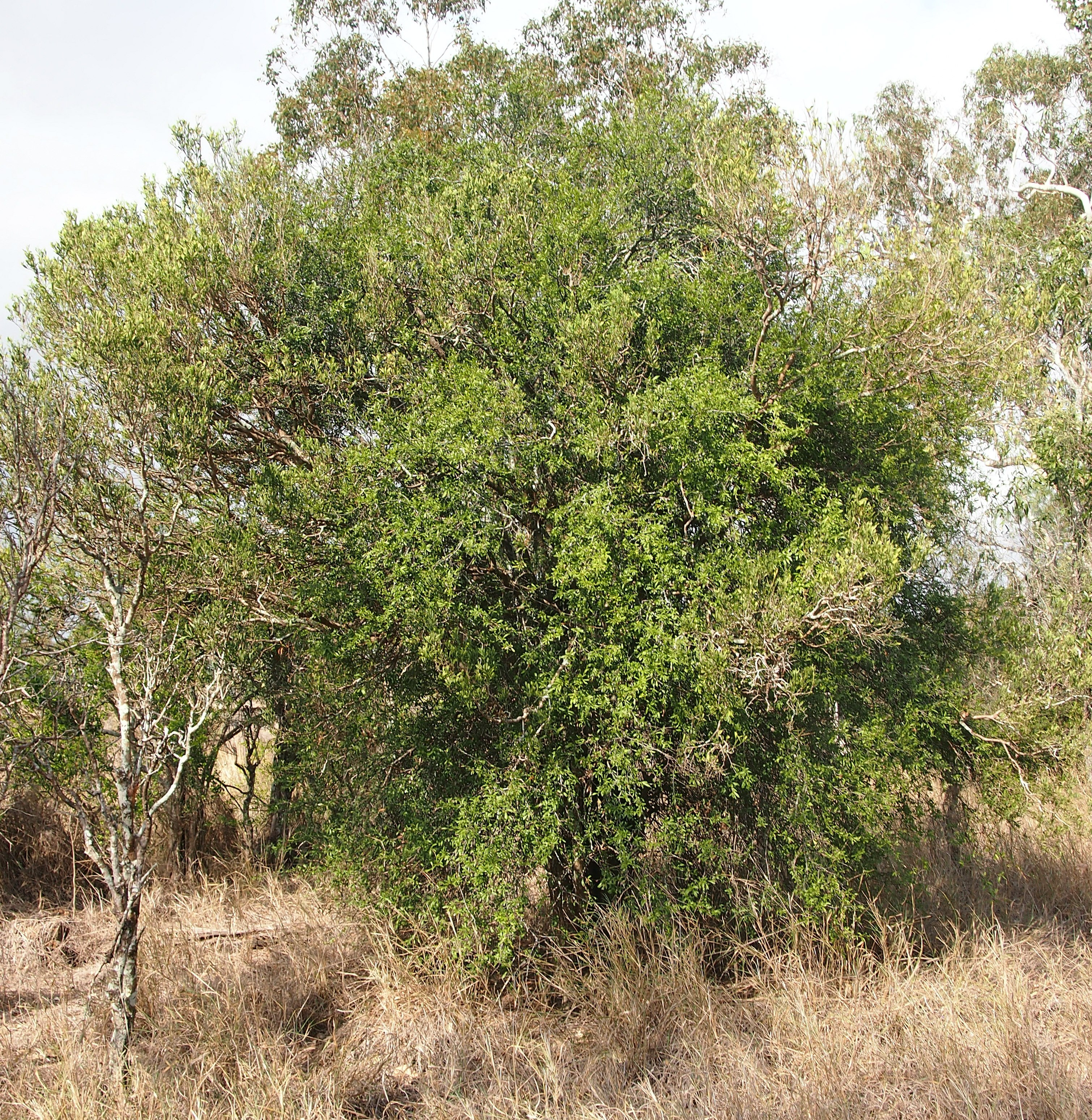

Scientific classification
- Kingdom: Plantae
- Clade: Tracheophytes
- Clade: Angiosperms
- Clade: Eudicots
- Clade: Rosids
- Order: Sapindales
- Family: Sapindaceae
- Genus: Alectryon
- Species: A. diversifolius

Binomial name
- Alectryon diversifolius (F.Muell.) S.T.Reynolds

Synonyms
- Heterodendrum diversifolium F.Muell.

= Alectryon diversifolius =

Species of flowering plant

Alectryon diversifolius, commonly named scrub boonaree or holly bush, is a species of Australian small trees of the plant family Sapindaceae.

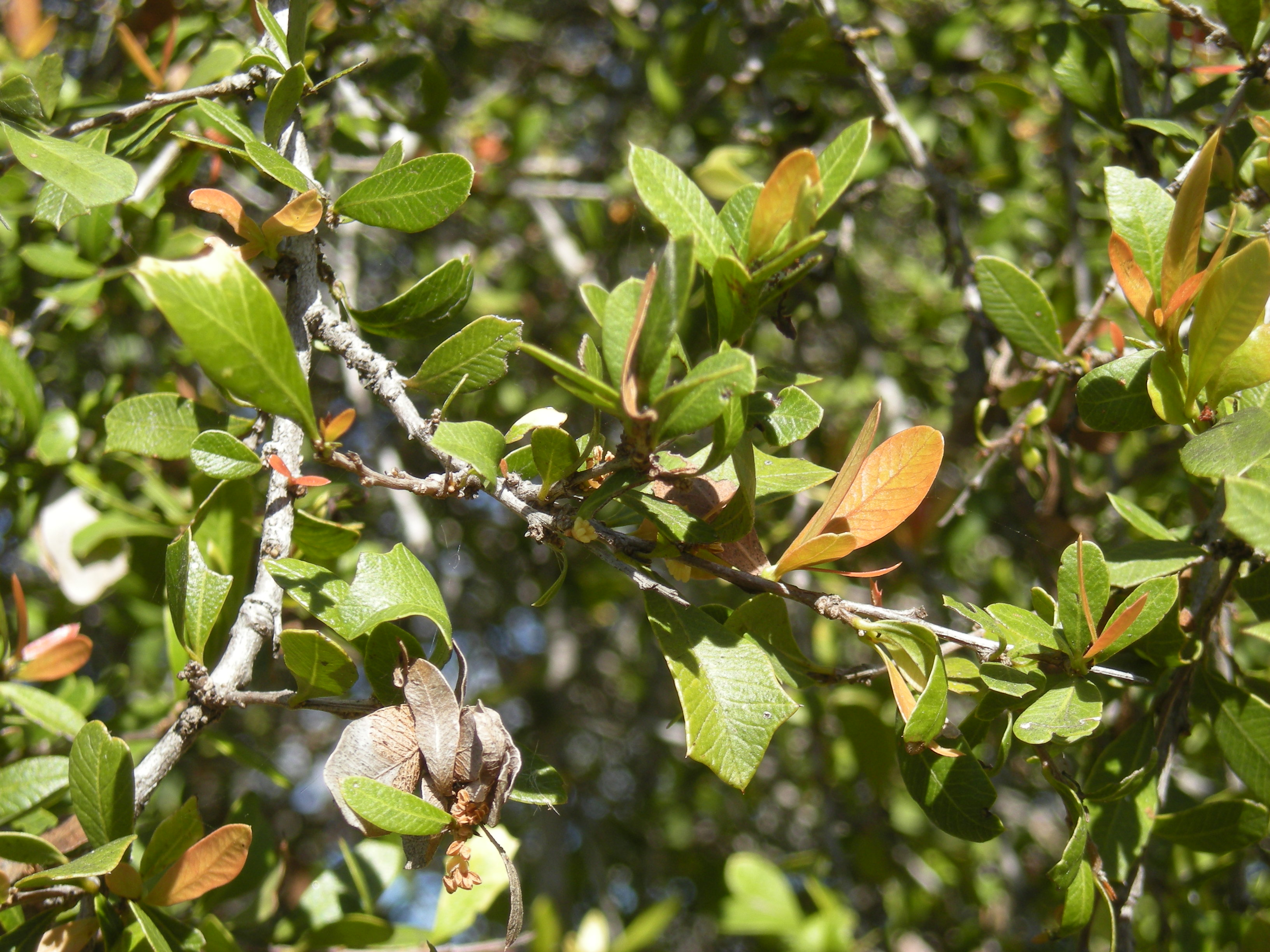
Alectryon diversifolius foliage showing the diversity of leaf forms.

== Description ==
Alectryon diversifolius grows as a shrub up to 4 m high, with simple leaves often clustered on short branchlets. Leaf shape is highly variable even on individual plants, ranging from oval to lanceolate to strongly serrated and holly-like.

== Distribution and habitat ==
The species occurs in central and south-eastern Qld and north-eastern N.S.W. Usually growing in Brigalow scrub in dark clay.

== Taxonomy ==
It was first described by Ferdinand von Mueller in 1858 as Heterodendrum diversifolius, but was moved to the genus, Alectryon by Sally T. Reynolds in 1987.
