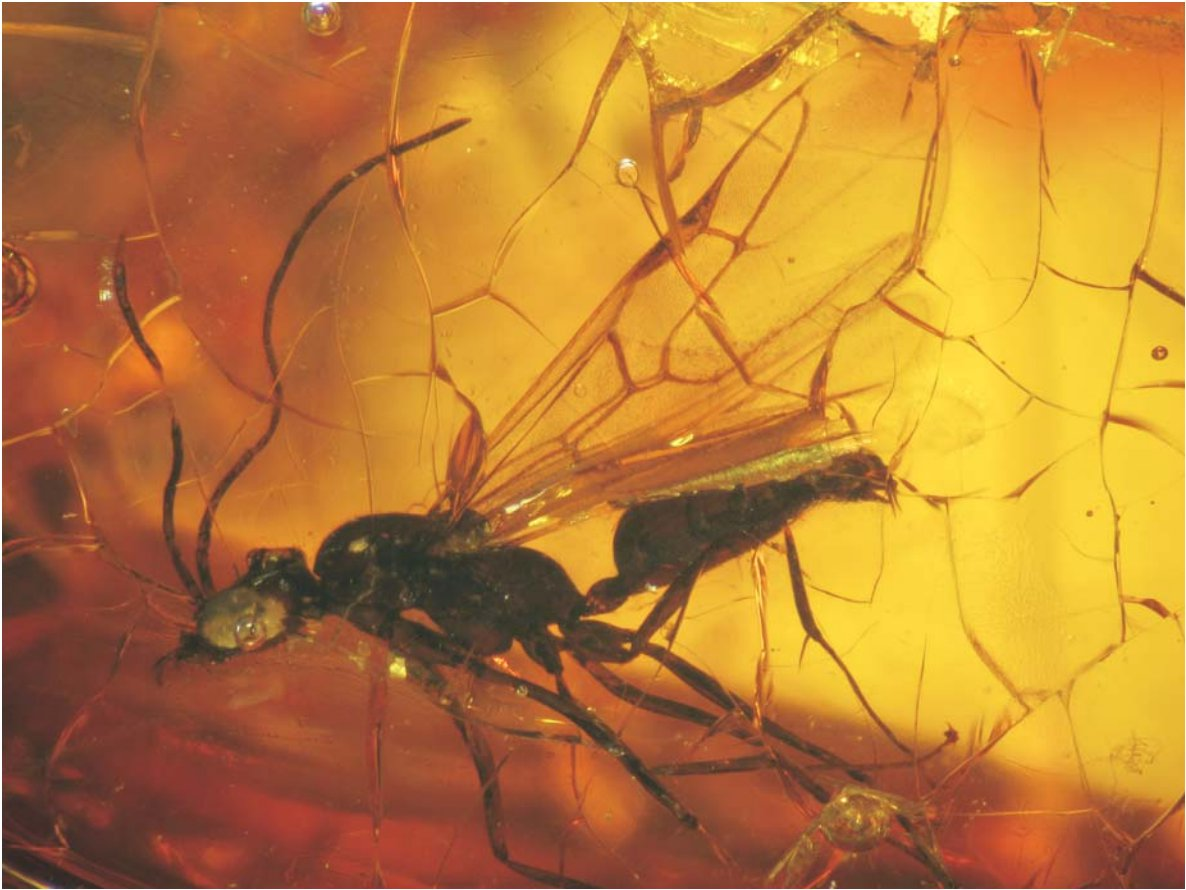
- Holotype male in profile view

Scientific classification
- Domain: Eukaryota
- Kingdom: Animalia
- Phylum: Arthropoda
- Class: Insecta
- Order: Hymenoptera
- Family: Formicidae
- Subfamily: Dolichoderinae
- Tribe: incertae sedis
- Genus: †Usomyrma; Dlussky, Radchenko & Dubovikoff, 2014
- Species: †U. mirabilis

Binomial name
- †Usomyrma mirabilis Dlussky, Radchenko & Dubovikoff, 2014

= Usomyrma =

Usomyrma Temporal range: Late Eocene

Genus of ants

Usomyrma is an extinct genus of ant in the formicid subfamily Dolichoderinae. The genus contains a single described species, Usomyrma mirabilis, that is known from two Middle Eocene fossils which were found in Scandinavian amber in Denmark.

== History ==
Usomyrma mirabilis is known from two isolated fossils, the holotype and paratype, both of which were housed in the collections of the Zoological Museum of the University of Copenhagen. The fossils are of two complete adult males which have been preserved as inclusions in transparent chunks of Scandinavian amber, also known as Danish amber, found in Denmark. Scandinavian amber is thought to be similar in age to Baltic, Bitterfeld and Rovno ambers, being approximately late Eocene in age. The four amber faunas have been shown to share 17 ant species in common, which make up over 80% of the specimens in amber collections studied for a 2009 paper. Though a large portion of specimens from Scandinavian amber are of species found in the other ambers, the overall fauna found is notably different from the other three. About twenty-four genera with thirty-five species of ants have been identified as inclusions in Scandinavian amber.

The fossils were first studied by paleoentomologists Gennady M. Dlussky of the Moscow State University, Alexander Radchenko of the Polish Academy of Sciences and Dmitry Dubovikoff of the Saint Petersburg State University. Their 2014 type description of the new genus and species was published in the journal Acta Palaeontologica Polonica. They coined the genus name as a combination of the Russian Us meaning "mustache" and often used vernacularly in Russia to mean insect antennae, plus myrmecos which is Greek for "ant". The combination was in recognition of the distinct structuring of the antennae on the males. The specific epithet is from the Latin word mirabilis which translates as "wonderful, marvellous, or miraculous", a nod to the unique morphology of the species.

== Classification and taxonomy ==
Based on interpretation of the wing venation in the U. mirabilis, Dlussky et al suggested the genus was a member of the Dolichoderinae tribe Leptomyrmecini along with the living Leptomyrmex "spider ants" and the Sicilian amber genus Leptomyrmula. They noted that an unsubscribed male Leptomyrmex male in Dominican amber was distinct enough from the Dominican amber species Leptomyrmex neotropicus to possibly warrant being placed into a new genus, but a full description of the male had not taken place as of 2014. Dlussky et al thought U. mirabilis represented an ancestral wing venation for the tribe, with a progression in vein reduction being present in Leptomyrmula. The Leptomyrmex was treated as a descendant genus of the ancestral form Usomyrma in the classification suggested by Dlussky et al.

A 2016 study showed the central cell reduction, on which placement of the genus was based, was shown to be derived several times in the subfamily and not specific to the tribe Leptomyrmecini. The study included the description of the species Leptomyrmex relictus from Brazil, and study of the micro-Leptomyrmex clade species. While the macro-Leptomyrmex species have a very reduced wing venation, the micro-Leptomyrmex clade is nested inside the macro species but have retained much of the vein structure unlike the macro-species. This mosaic of both retained wing venation and reduced wing venation within Leptomyrmex contradicted the gradual vein loss hypothesis that was proposed for an evolutionary grade of Usomyrma - Leptomyrmula - Leptomyrmex. As such both Usomyrma and Leptomyrmula were moved to being placed in Dolichoderinae without tribal placement.

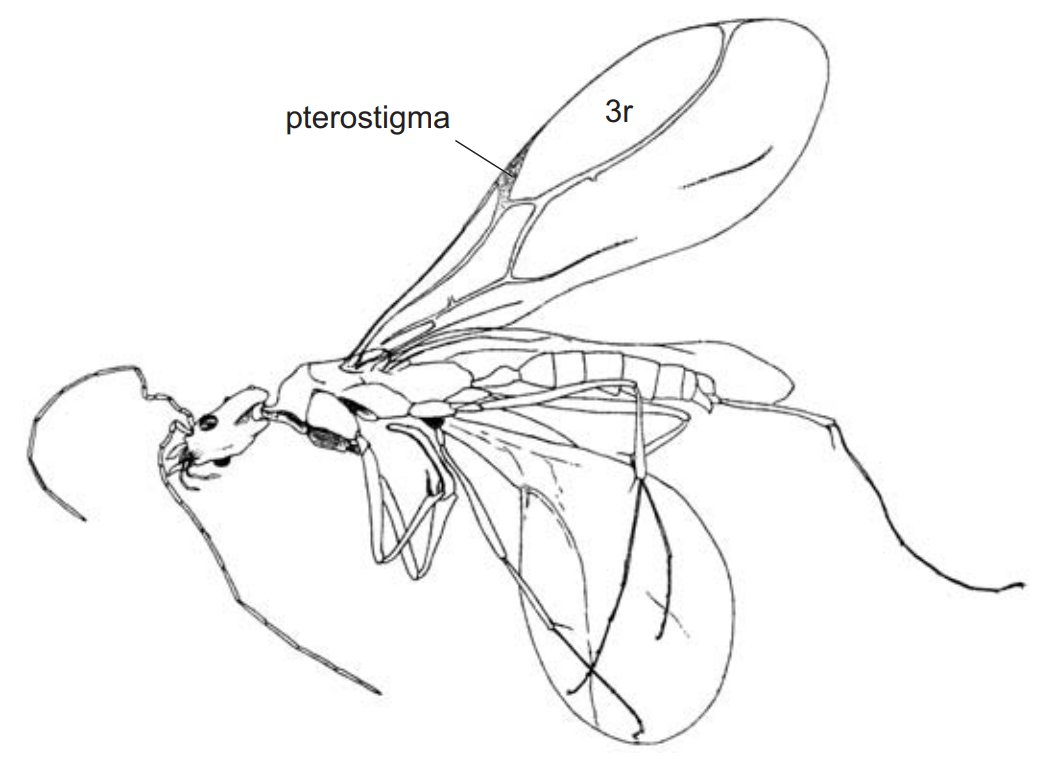
Drawing of the Leptomyrmula maravignae male

== Description ==
The described males are approximately 3.5 mm (0.14 in) with a slender profile and elongated appendages. The head is rectangular in outline, being slightly longer than wide, with a straight rear margin and rounded rear edges. Behind the compound eyes, the temples are long with an elevated occiput sporting three large ocelli. Each of the two compound eyes are big, being 0.6 of the head length, with a reniform outline, the concave side of the eye along the front sides. The clypeus is distinct in outline, being elongated with the middle swollen to form an almost triangular bump pointing forward and the rear section of the clypeus is retangular and flattened. Each of the mandibles are triangular and long with a dentate chewing edge that is long and curved showing a pointed apical tooth and at least smaller teeth. Below the crossed mandible tips are the six segmented maxillary palps and the four segmented labial palps. The antennae are elongated with 13 segments, the second funicular segment being distinctly elongate and curved. The fore-wings show a well developed pterostigma and venation that forms several fully closed cells.
