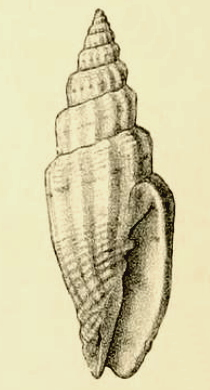
- Drawing of a shell of Vexillum superbiens (holotype)

Scientific classification
- Kingdom: Animalia
- Phylum: Mollusca
- Class: Gastropoda
- Subclass: Caenogastropoda
- Order: Neogastropoda
- Superfamily: Turbinelloidea
- Family: Costellariidae
- Genus: Vexillum
- Species: V. superbiens

Binomial name
- Vexillum superbiens (Melvill, 1895)

Synonyms
- Mitra (Turricula) superbiens Melvill, 1895; Vexillum (Vexillum) superbiens (Melvill, 1895)

= Vexillum superbiens =

Species of gastropod

Vexillum superbiens is a species of small sea snail, marine gastropod mollusk in the family Costellariidae, the ribbed miters.

The Australian Faunal Directory considers this species as a synonym of Vexillum vulpecula (Linnaeus, 1758).

== Description ==
The length of the shell attains 37 mm.

(Original description) A striking, solid, fusiform shell of a chalky-white colour. The shell contains nine whorls. It is neatly longitudinally costate, delicately transversely striate. The upper whorls are once, the last whorls twice banded concentrically. The ribs are, except on the dorsal surface of the body whorl, left white and uncoloured. The body whorl is bicingulate. The aperture is narrow and straight. The columella is thrice plaited. The siphonal canal is almost straight, and hardly recurved at the base.

== Distribution ==
This marine species occurs off the Philippines and West Australia.
