= Dromaeschna =

Scientific classification
- Kingdom: Animalia
- Phylum: Arthropoda
- Clade: Pancrustacea
- Class: Insecta
- Order: Odonata
- Suborder: Anisoptera
- Family: Aeshnidae
- Genus: Dromaeschna; Förster, 1908

Genus of dragonflies

Dromaeschna is a genus of dragonflies in the family Aeshnidae. Species of Dromaeschna are large dragonflies endemic to north-eastern Australia.

Dromaeschna is considered a distinct genus in the World Odonata List, however, due to recent research and taxonomic updates, it is no longer considered to be a distinct genus by the Australian Faunal Directory, which now considers its species to be in the genus Austroaeschna.

== Species ==
The genus Dromaeschna includes the following two species:

- Dromaeschna forcipata (Tillyard, 1907) – green-striped darner
- Dromaeschna weiskei Förster, 1908 – ochre-tipped darner

== Etymology ==
The genus name Dromaeschna is derived from the Greek δρόμος (dromos, "running" or "course"), combined with -aeschna, a suffix commonly used for dragonflies associated with the Aeshna group. The reason for the application of the name is unknown.

== See also ==
- List of Odonata species of Australia
