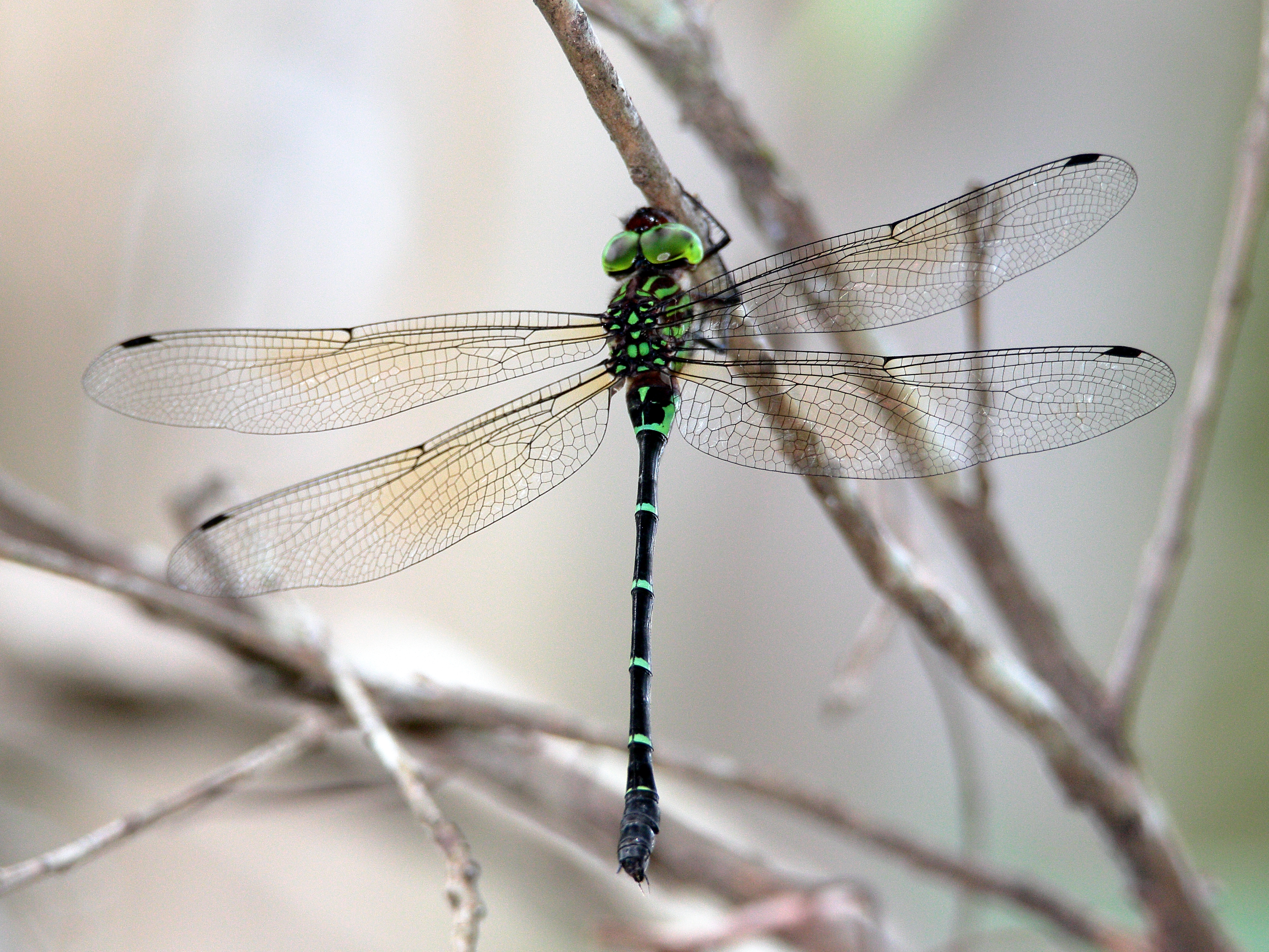
- Female, Cairns

Conservation status
- Least Concern (IUCN 3.1)

Scientific classification
- Kingdom: Animalia
- Phylum: Arthropoda
- Clade: Pancrustacea
- Class: Insecta
- Order: Odonata
- Suborder: Anisoptera
- Family: Aeshnidae
- Genus: Dromaeschna
- Species: D. forcipata

Binomial name
- Dromaeschna forcipata (Tillyard, 1907)

Synonyms
- Planaeschna forcipata Tillyard, 1907; Dromaeschna severini Förster, 1908

= Dromaeschna forcipata =

Green-striped darner

Species of dragonfly

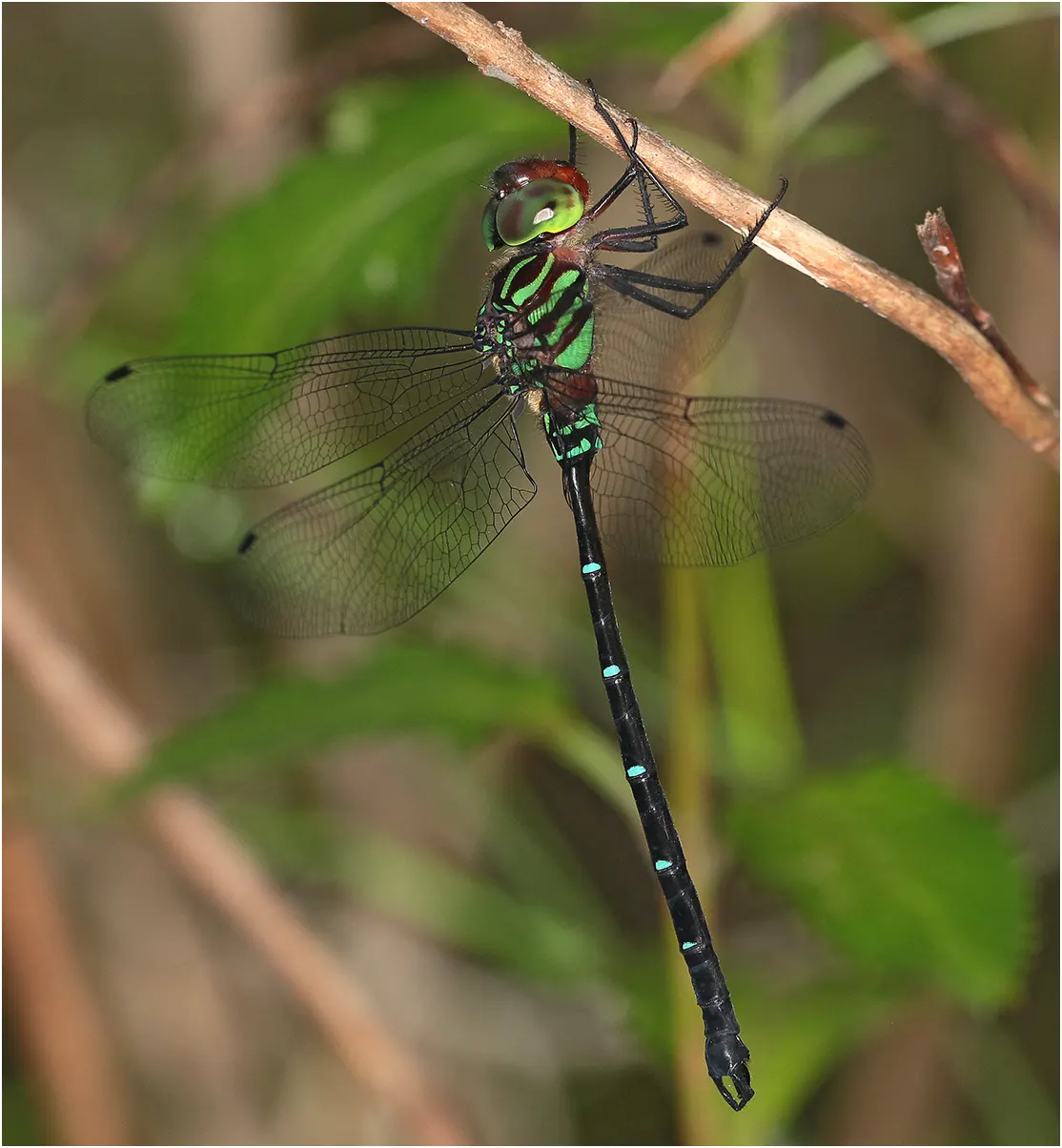
Dromaeschna forcipata male

Dromaeschna forcipata is a species of dragonfly in the family Aeshnidae, known commonly as the green-striped darner. It generally inhabits streams in coastal rainforests of north-eastern Queensland, Australia.

Dromaeschna forcipata is a large black dragonfly with dark green markings. The side of its body appears to have alternate black and green stripes.

== Taxonomy ==
The Australian Faunal Directory no longer considers Dromaeschna to be a distinct genus, and Dromaeschna forcipata now has the name, Austroaeschna forcipata.

However, World Odonata List uses the name Dromaeschna forcipata.

== Etymology ==
The genus name Dromaeschna is derived from the Greek δρόμος (dromos, "running" or "course"), combined with -aeschna, a suffix commonly used for dragonflies associated with the Aeshna group. The reason for the application of the name is unknown.

The species name forcipata is derived from the Latin forceps ("tongs" or "pincers"), referring to the shape of the male appendages.

== Gallery ==
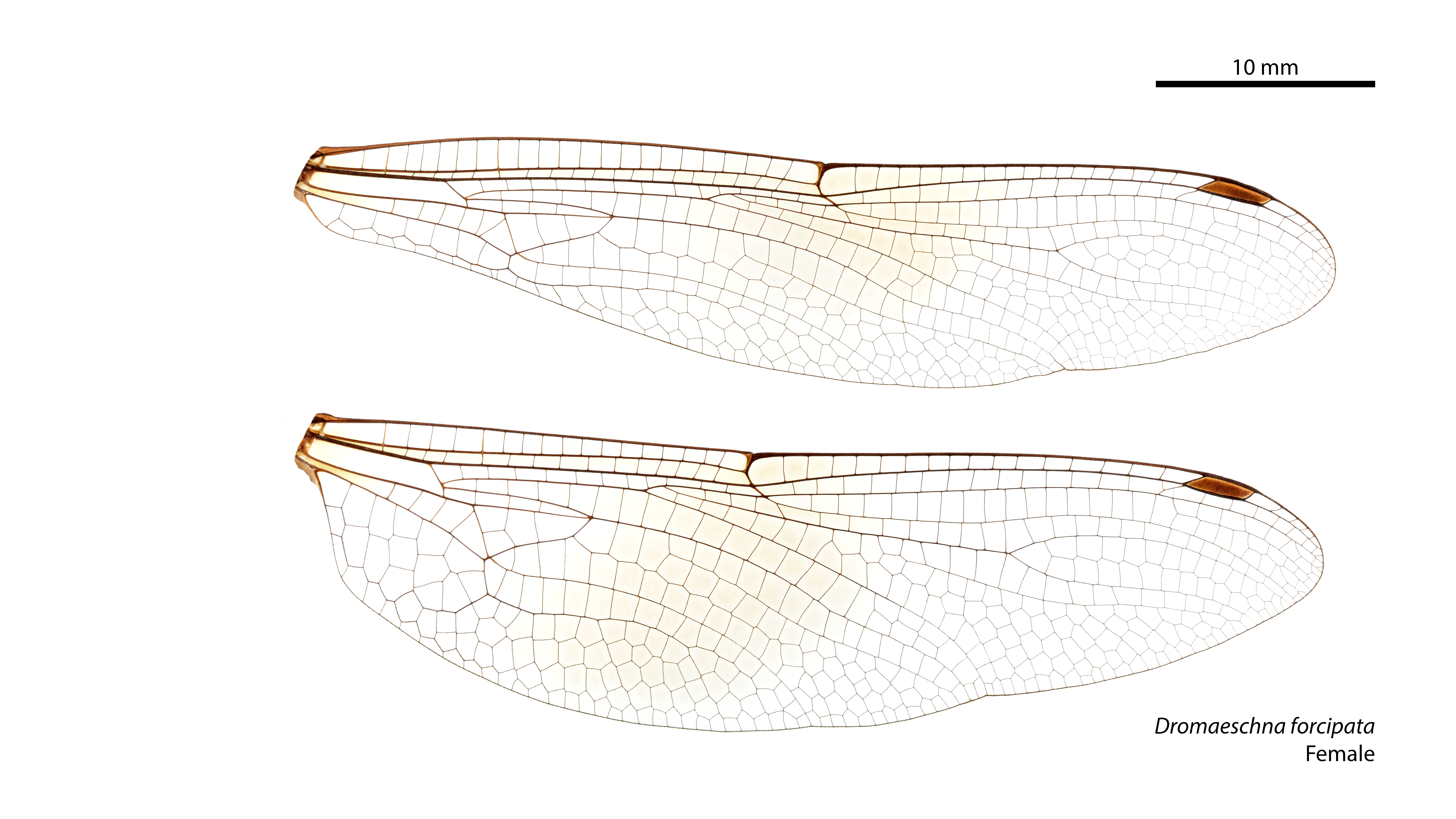
Female wings

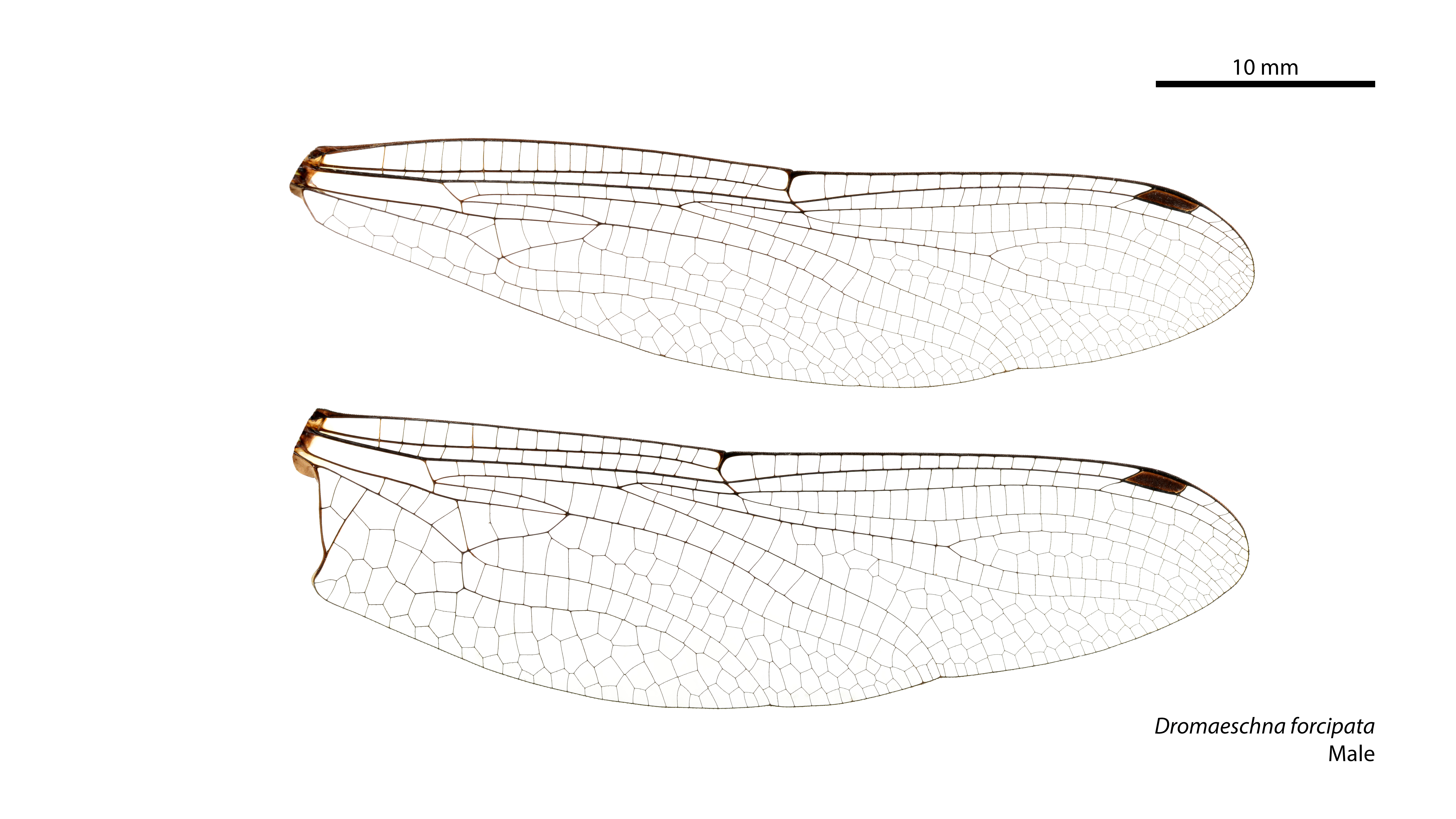
Male wings

== See also ==
- List of dragonflies of Australia
