= Zaeeropsis lepida =

Scientific classification
- Kingdom: Animalia
- Phylum: Arthropoda
- Class: Insecta
- Order: Coleoptera
- Suborder: Polyphaga
- Infraorder: Cucujiformia
- Family: Cerambycidae
- Genus: Zaeeropsis
- Species: Z. lepida

Binomial name
- Zaeeropsis lepida (Germar, 1848)

Species of beetle

Zaeeropsis lepida is a species of beetle in the family Cerambycidae. It was first described by Ernst Friedrich Germar in 1848 as Anaesthetis lepida. It is known from Australia. The Australian Faunal Directory recognises Rhytophora lepida as the accepted name for this species.
