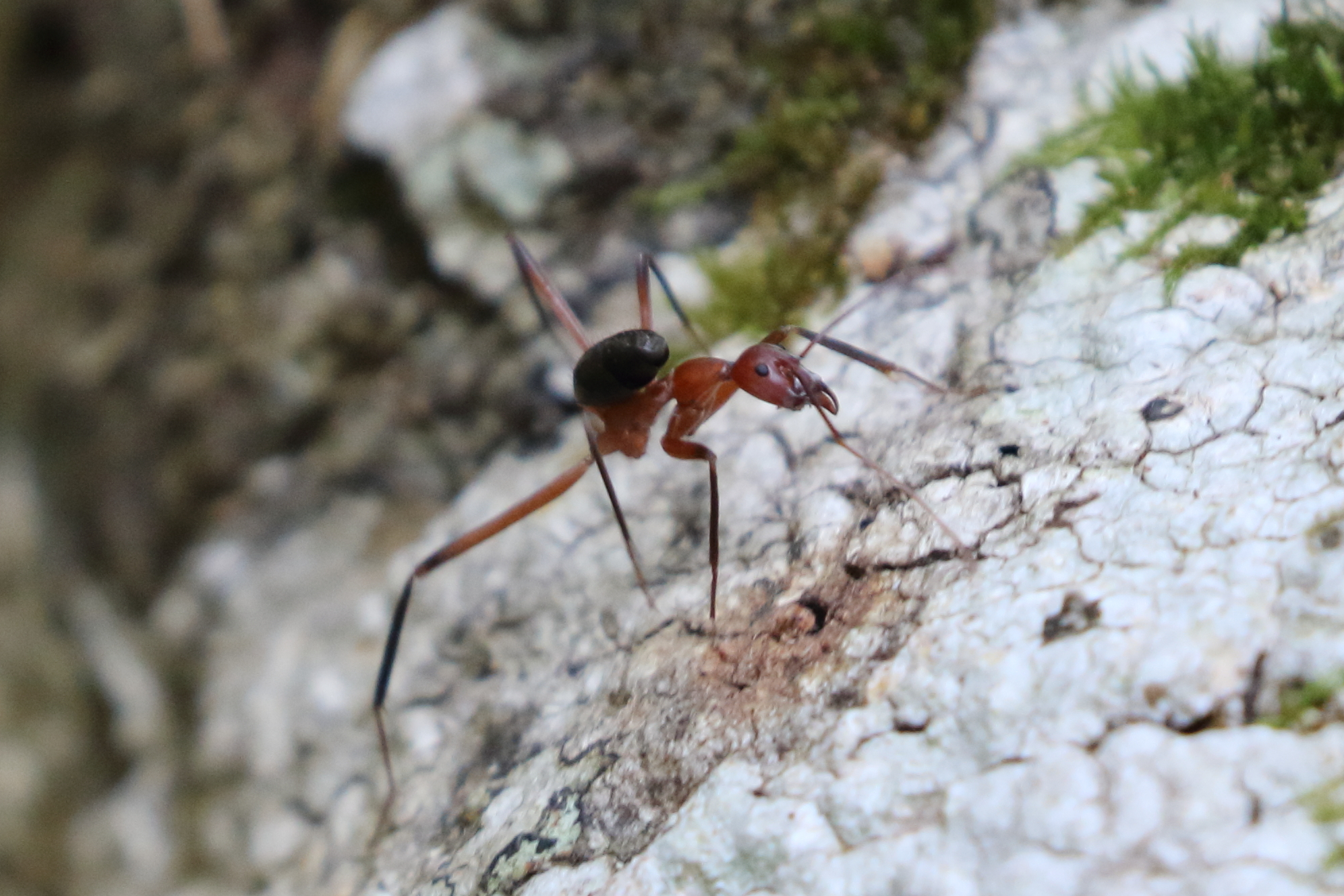

Scientific classification
- Kingdom: Animalia
- Phylum: Arthropoda
- Clade: Pancrustacea
- Class: Insecta
- Order: Hymenoptera
- Family: Formicidae
- Subfamily: Dolichoderinae
- Genus: Leptomyrmex
- Species: L. tibialis

Binomial name
- Leptomyrmex tibialis Emery, 1895

Synonyms
- Leptomyrmex nigriventris hackeri Wheeler, W.M., 1934; Leptomyrmex nigriventris tibialis Emery, 1895

= Leptomyrmex tibialis =

Species of ant

Leptomyrmex tibialis is a species of ant in the genus Leptomyrmex. First described by Carlo Emery in 1895 as Leptomyrmex nigriventris tibialis, the species is endemic to Australia, and found in both New South Wales and Queensland. The arguments for synonymy were made by Lucky and Ward, and the decision was accepted by the Australian Faunal Directory.
