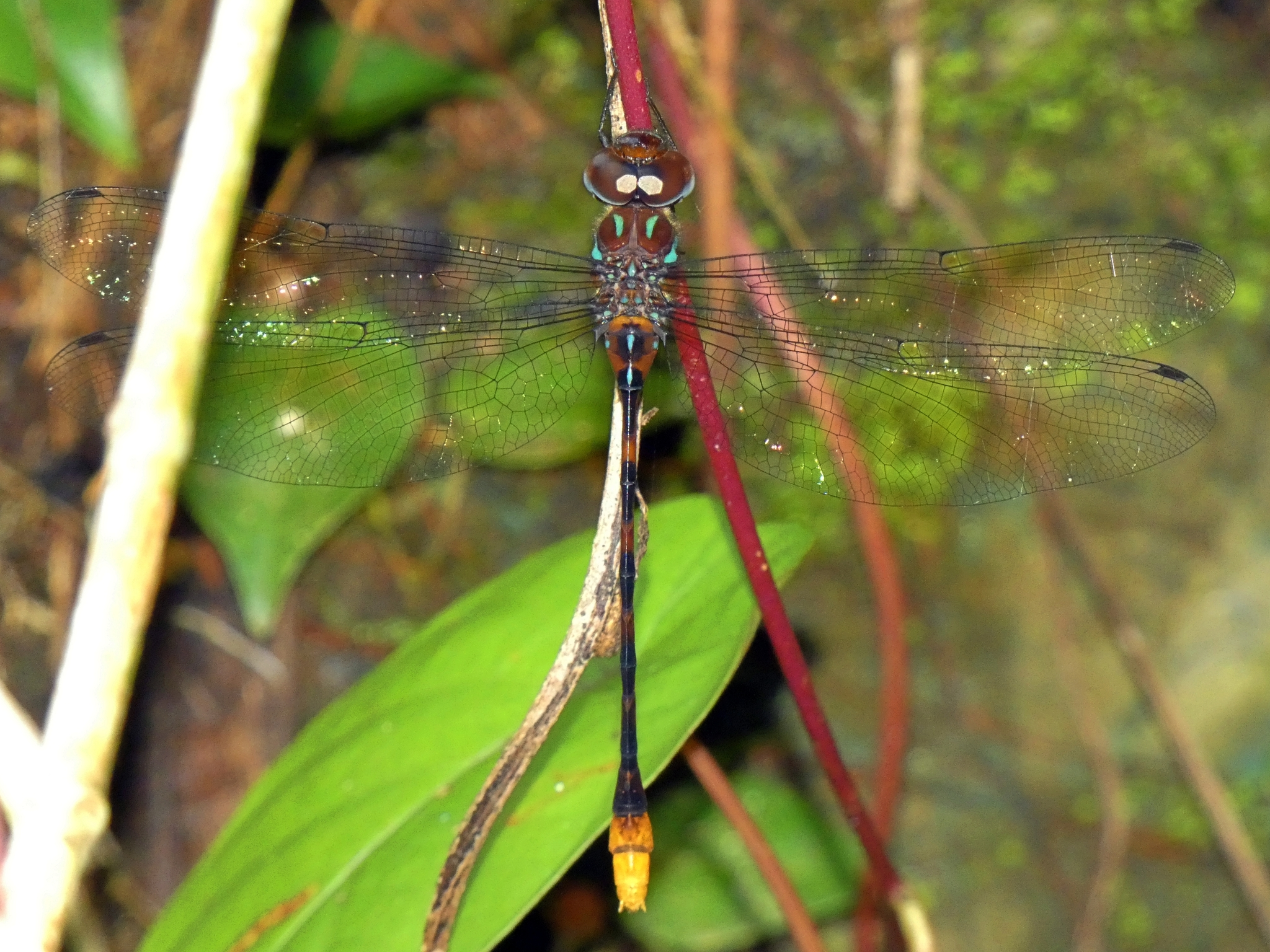
- Female Ochre-tipped Darner

Conservation status
- Least Concern (IUCN 3.1)

Scientific classification
- Kingdom: Animalia
- Phylum: Arthropoda
- Clade: Pancrustacea
- Class: Insecta
- Order: Odonata
- Suborder: Anisoptera
- Family: Aeshnidae
- Genus: Dromaeschna
- Species: D. weiskei

Binomial name
- Dromaeschna weiskei Förster, 1908

= Dromaeschna weiskei =

Ochre-tipped darner

Species of dragonfly

Dromaeschna weiskei is a species of dragonfly in the family Aeshnidae, known as an ochre-tipped darner. It inhabits streams in coastal rainforests of north-eastern Queensland, Australia.

Dromaeschna weiskei is a large black dragonfly with pale green markings and an orange-red tip to its tail.

== Taxonomy ==
The Australian Faunal Directory no longer considers Dromaeschna to be a distinct genus, and Dromaeschna weiskei now has the name, Austroaeschna weiskei.

However, World Odonata List uses the name Dromaeschna weiskei.

== Etymology ==
The genus name Dromaeschna is derived from the Greek δρόμος (dromos, "running" or "course"), combined with -aeschna, a suffix commonly used for dragonflies associated with the Aeshna group. The reason for the application of the name is unknown.

In 1908, Friedrich Förster named this species weiskei, an eponym honouring its collector, Emil Weiske (1867–1950).

== Gallery ==
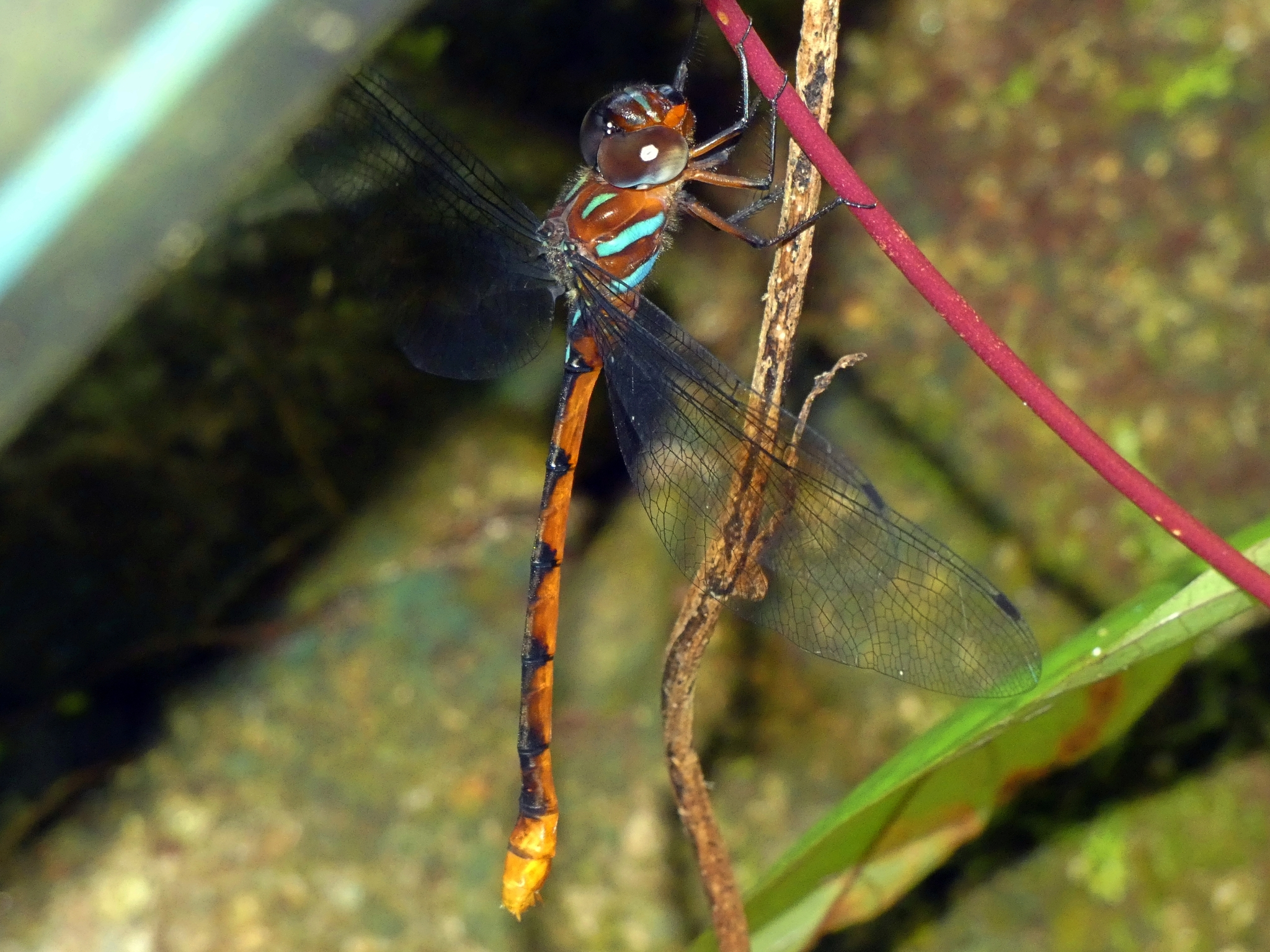
Female

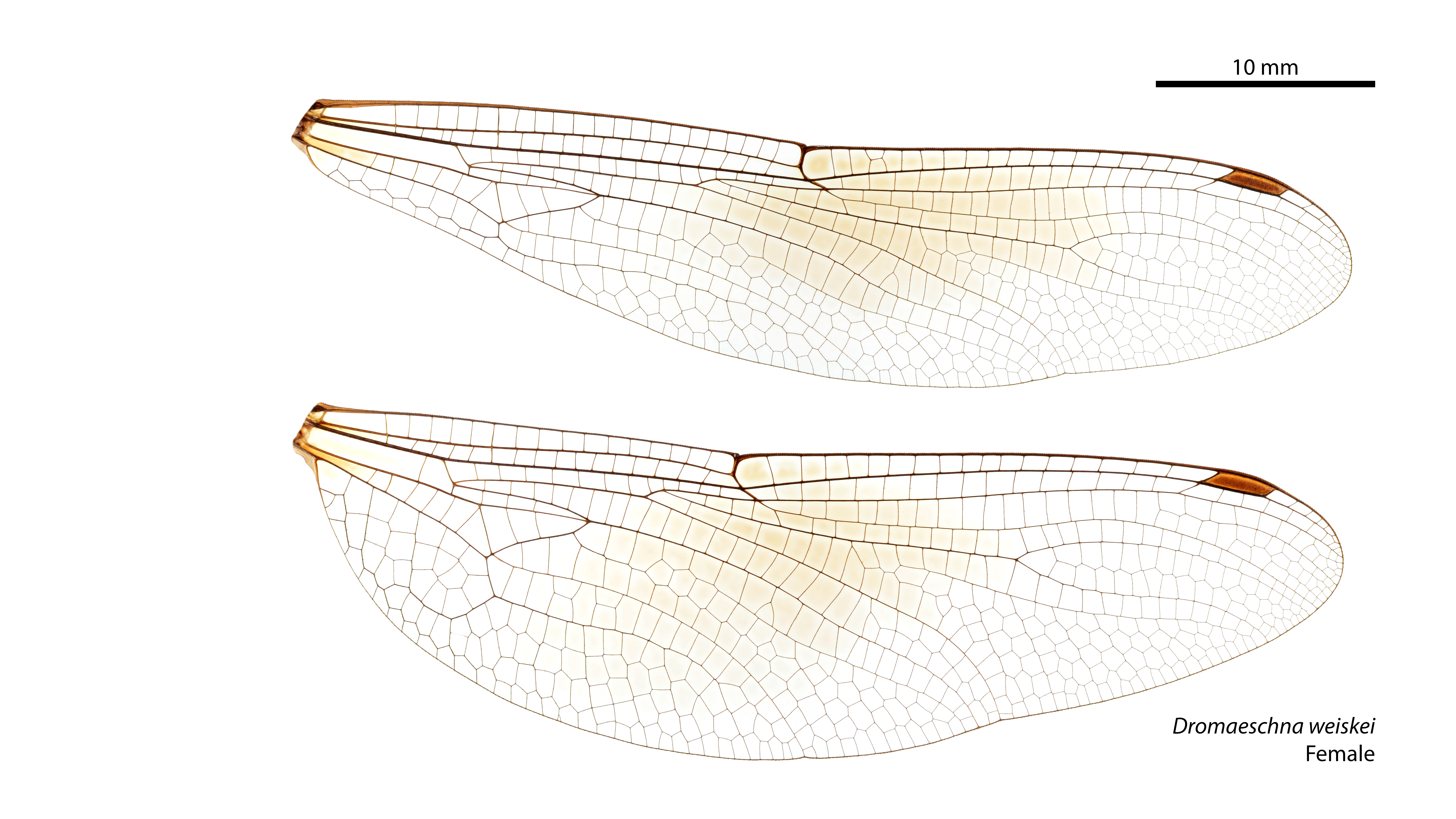
Female wings

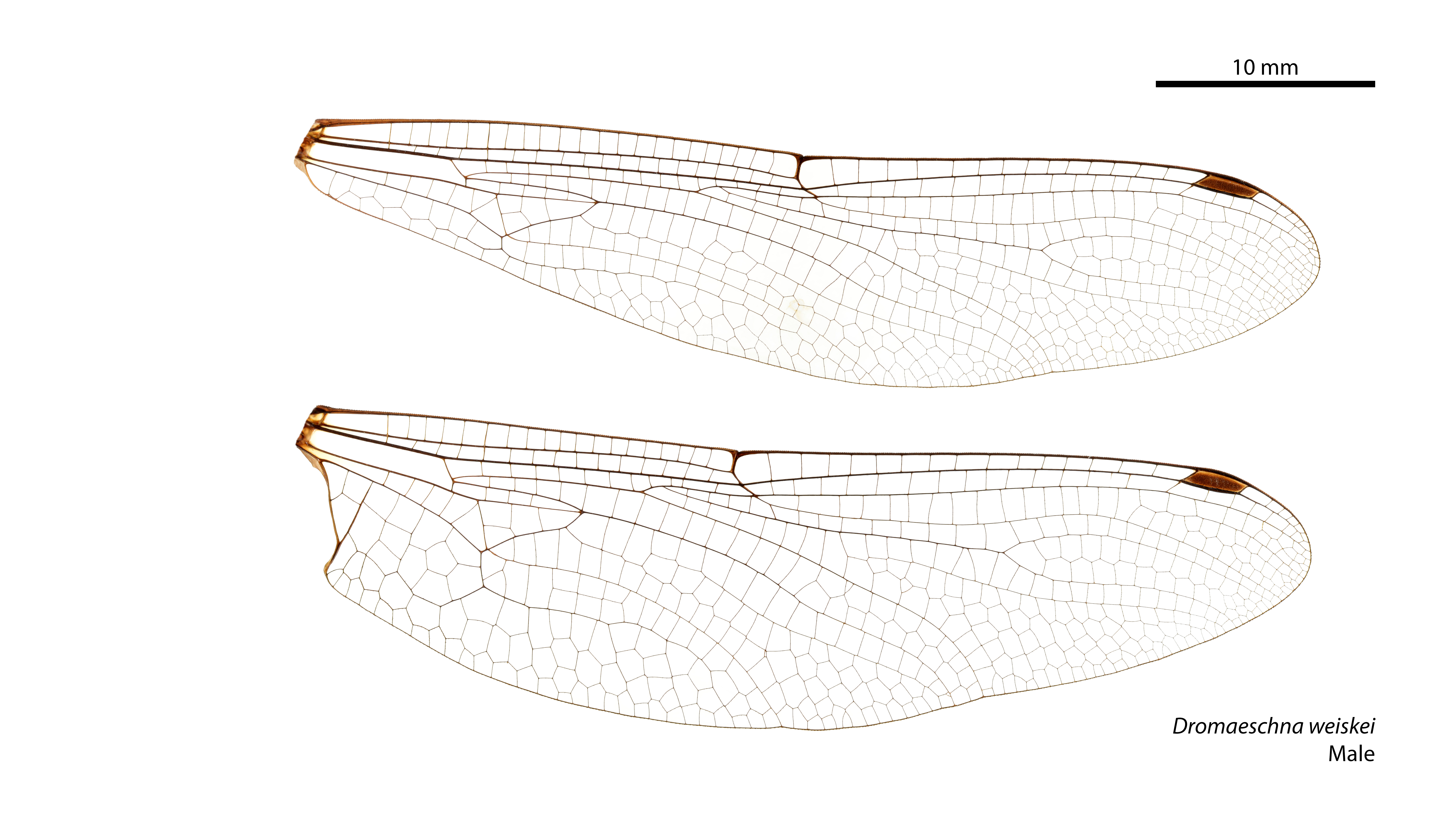
Male wings

== See also ==
- List of dragonflies of Australia
