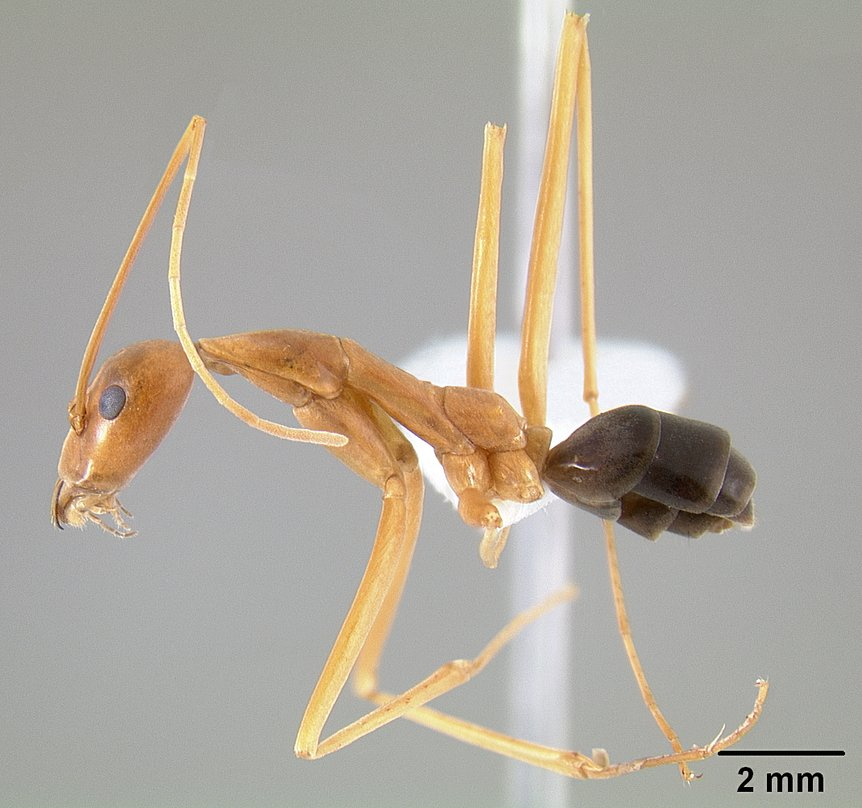

Scientific classification
- Kingdom: Animalia
- Phylum: Arthropoda
- Clade: Pancrustacea
- Class: Insecta
- Order: Hymenoptera
- Family: Formicidae
- Subfamily: Dolichoderinae
- Genus: Leptomyrmex
- Species: L. pallens

Binomial name
- Leptomyrmex pallens Emery, 1883

= Leptomyrmex pallens =

Species of ant

Leptomyrmex pallens is a species of ant in the genus Leptomyrmex. Described by Carlo Emery in 1883, the species is only endemic to New Caledonia.
