= Zaeeropsis godeffroyi =

Scientific classification
- Kingdom: Animalia
- Phylum: Arthropoda
- Class: Insecta
- Order: Coleoptera
- Suborder: Polyphaga
- Infraorder: Cucujiformia
- Family: Cerambycidae
- Genus: Zaeeropsis
- Species: Z. godeffroyi

Binomial name
- Zaeeropsis godeffroyi Breuning, 1943

Species of beetle

Zaeeropsis godeffroyi is a species of beetle in the family Cerambycidae. It was described by Stephan von Breuning in 1943. It is known from Australia.
