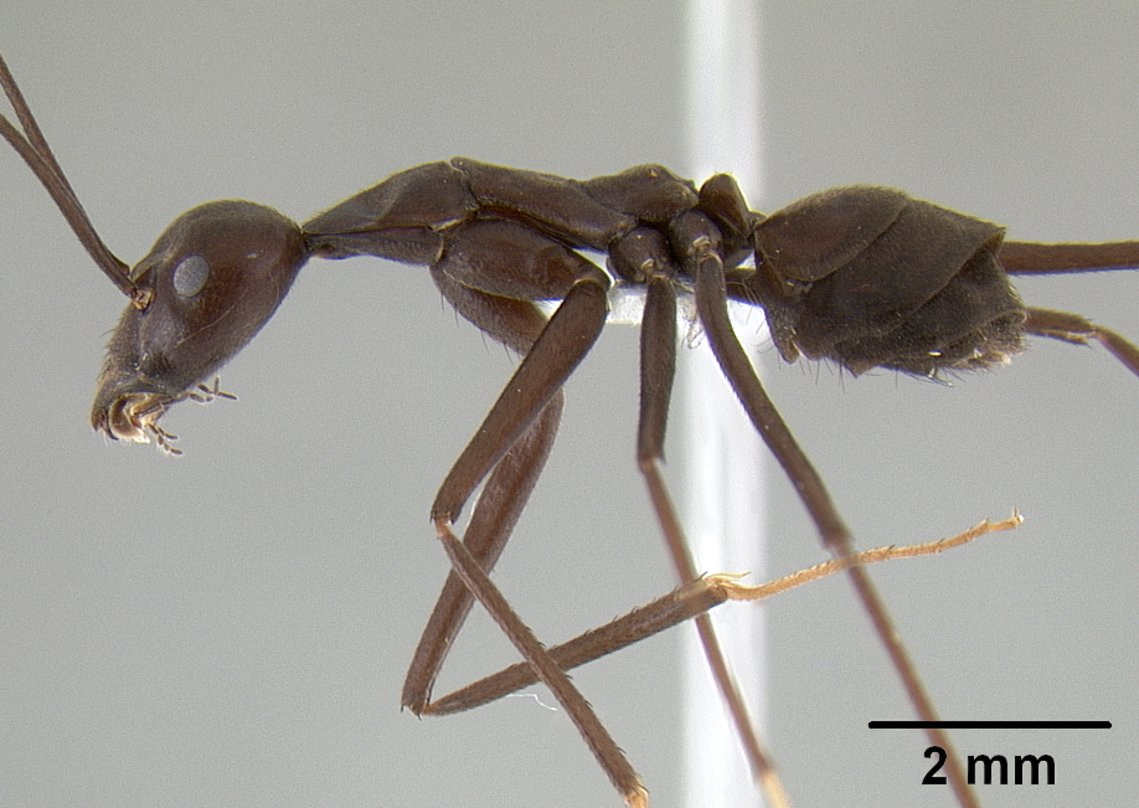
- '

Scientific classification
- Kingdom: Animalia
- Phylum: Arthropoda
- Clade: Pancrustacea
- Class: Insecta
- Order: Hymenoptera
- Family: Formicidae
- Subfamily: Dolichoderinae
- Genus: Leptomyrmex
- Species: L. flavitarsus

Binomial name
- Leptomyrmex flavitarsus (Smith, F., 1859)

= Leptomyrmex flavitarsus =

Species of ant

Leptomyrmex flavitarsus is a species of ant in the genus Leptomyrmex. Described by Smith in 1859, the species is endemic to Indonesia and New Guinea.
