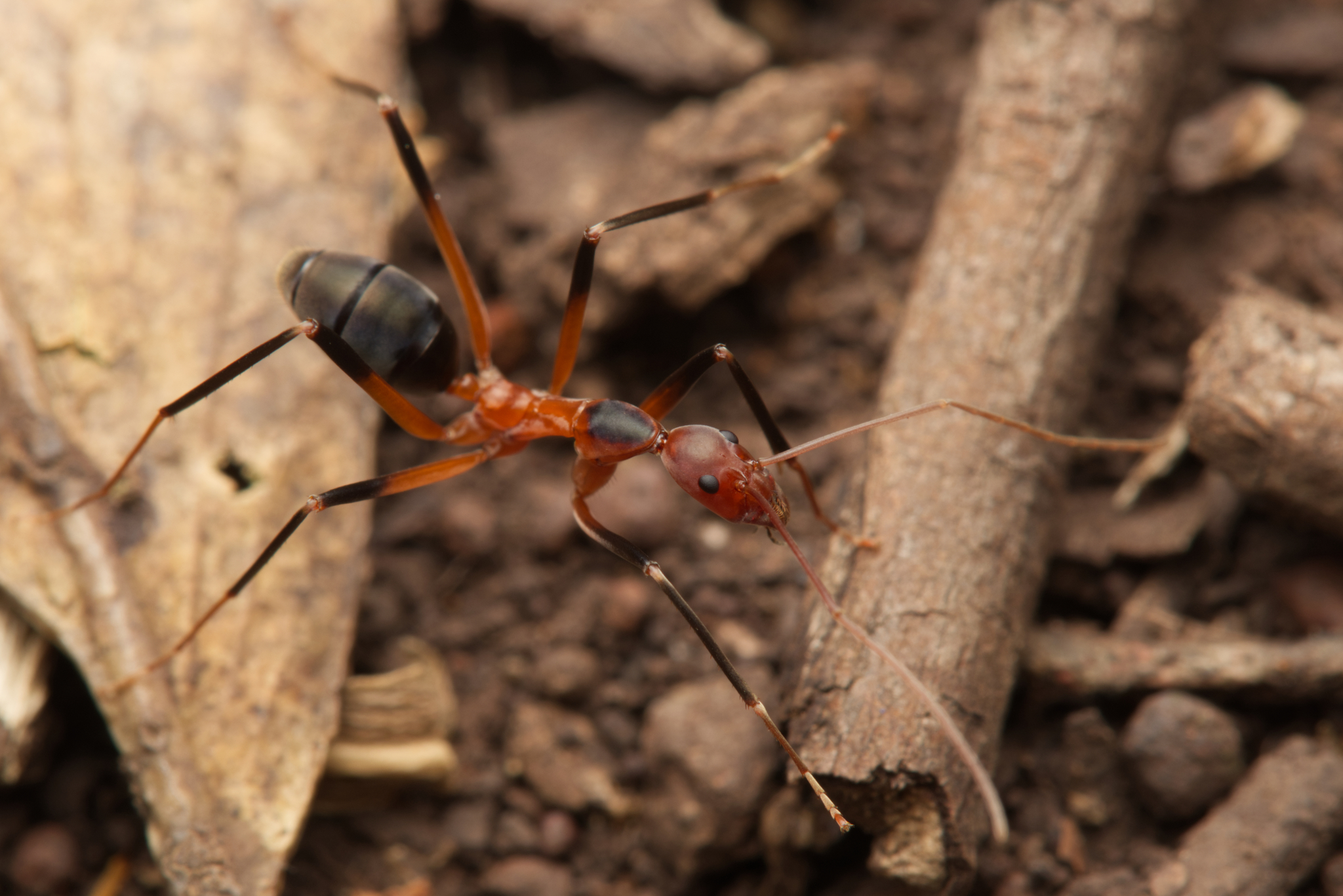
- Leptomyrmex cnemidatus, Australia

Scientific classification
- Kingdom: Animalia
- Phylum: Arthropoda
- Clade: Pancrustacea
- Class: Insecta
- Order: Hymenoptera
- Family: Formicidae
- Subfamily: Dolichoderinae
- Genus: Leptomyrmex
- Species: L. cnemidatus

Binomial name
- Leptomyrmex cnemidatus Wheeler, W.M., 1915

Synonyms
- Leptomyrmex erythrocephalus brunneiceps Wheeler, W.M., 1934; Leptomyrmex erythrocephalus venustus Wheeler, W.M., 1934

= Leptomyrmex cnemidatus =

Species of ant

Leptomyrmex cnemidatus is a species of ant in the genus Leptomyrmex. Described by William Morton Wheeler in 1915, the species is endemic to Australia.
