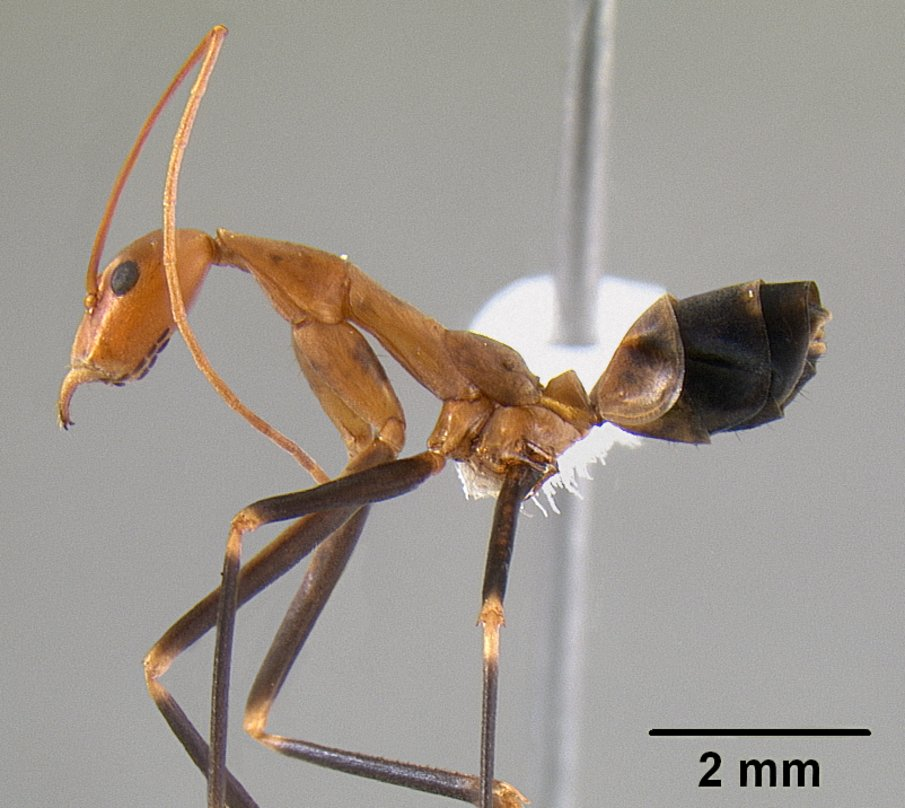
- L. darlingtoni worker from Australia

Scientific classification
- Kingdom: Animalia
- Phylum: Arthropoda
- Clade: Pancrustacea
- Class: Insecta
- Order: Hymenoptera
- Family: Formicidae
- Subfamily: Dolichoderinae
- Genus: Leptomyrmex
- Species: L. darlingtoni

Binomial name
- Leptomyrmex darlingtoni Wheeler, W.M., 1934

Synonyms
- Leptomyrmex darlingtoni fascigaster Wheeler, W.M., 1934; Leptomyrmex darlingtoni jucundus Wheeler, W.M., 1934

= Leptomyrmex darlingtoni =

Species of ant

Leptomyrmex darlingtoni is a species of ant in the genus Leptomyrmex. Described by William Morton Wheeler in 1934, the species is endemic to Australia.
