= Zaeeropsis =

Scientific classification
- Kingdom: Animalia
- Phylum: Arthropoda
- Class: Insecta
- Order: Coleoptera
- Suborder: Polyphaga
- Infraorder: Cucujiformia
- Family: Cerambycidae
- Tribe: Pteropliini
- Genus: Zaeeropsis

Genus of beetles

Zaeeropsis is a genus of longhorn beetles of the subfamily Lamiinae, containing the following species:

- Zaeeropsis godeffroyi Breuning, 1943
- Zaeeropsis lepida (Germar, 1848)
