= Leptomyrmex geniculatus =

Scientific classification
- Kingdom: Animalia
- Phylum: Arthropoda
- Clade: Pancrustacea
- Class: Insecta
- Order: Hymenoptera
- Family: Formicidae
- Subfamily: Dolichoderinae
- Genus: Leptomyrmex
- Species: L. geniculatus

Binomial name
- Leptomyrmex geniculatus Emery, 1914

Species of ant

Leptomyrmex geniculatus is a species of ant in the genus Leptomyrmex. Described by Carlo Emery in 1914, the species is endemic to New Caledonia.
