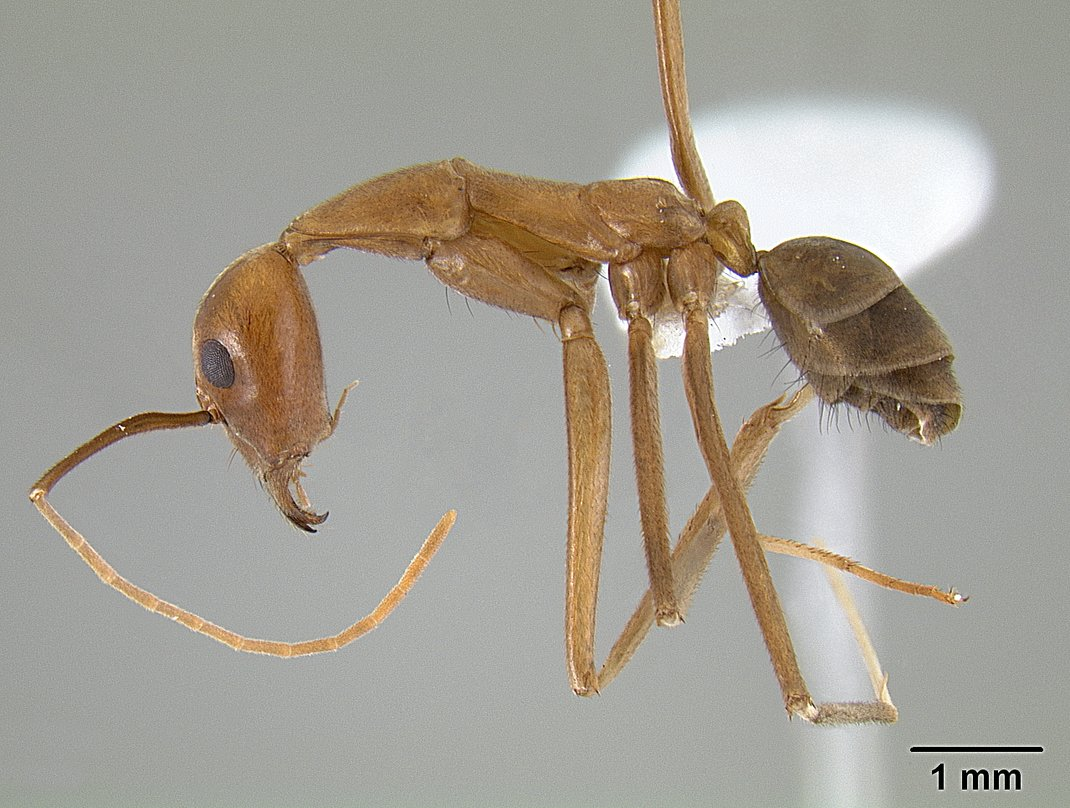

Scientific classification
- Kingdom: Animalia
- Phylum: Arthropoda
- Clade: Pancrustacea
- Class: Insecta
- Order: Hymenoptera
- Family: Formicidae
- Subfamily: Dolichoderinae
- Genus: Leptomyrmex
- Species: L. puberulus

Binomial name
- Leptomyrmex puberulus Wheeler, W.M., 1934

= Leptomyrmex puberulus =

Species of ant

Leptomyrmex puberulus is a species of ant in the genus Leptomyrmex. Described by William Morton Wheeler in 1934, the species is endemic to New Guinea.
