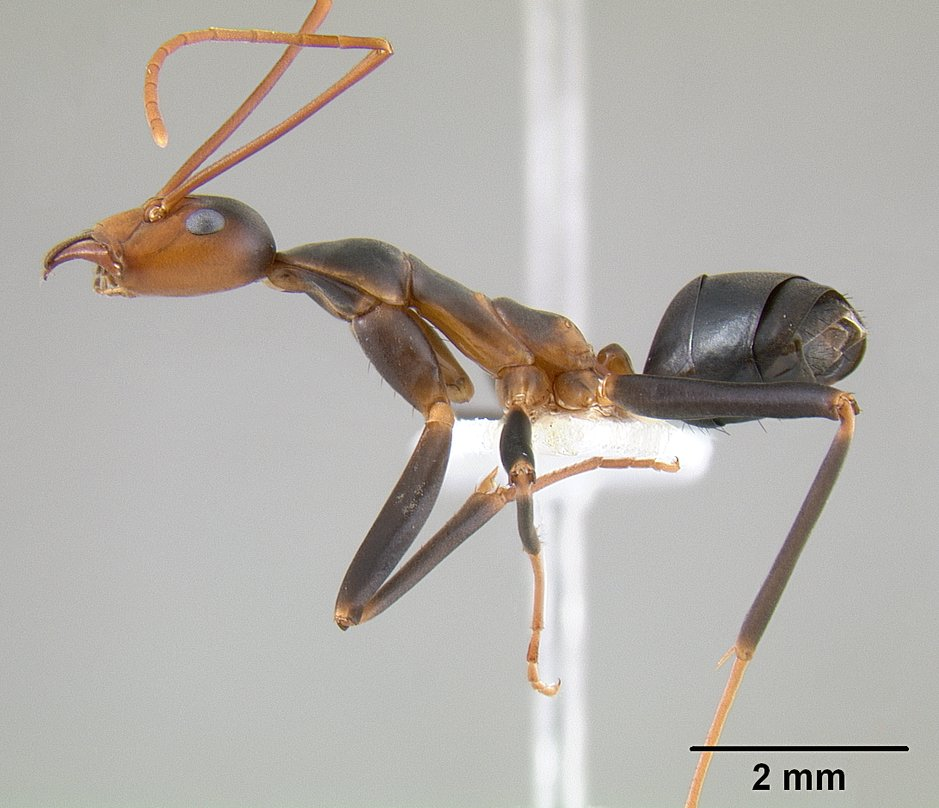

Scientific classification
- Kingdom: Animalia
- Phylum: Arthropoda
- Clade: Pancrustacea
- Class: Insecta
- Order: Hymenoptera
- Family: Formicidae
- Subfamily: Dolichoderinae
- Genus: Leptomyrmex
- Species: L. wiburdi

Binomial name
- Leptomyrmex wiburdi Wheeler, W.M., 1915

Synonyms
- Leptomyrmex wiburdi pictus Wheeler, W.M., 1915

= Leptomyrmex wiburdi =

Species of ant

Leptomyrmex wiburdi is a species of ant in the genus Leptomyrmex. Described by William Morton Wheeler in 1915, the species is endemic to Australia.
