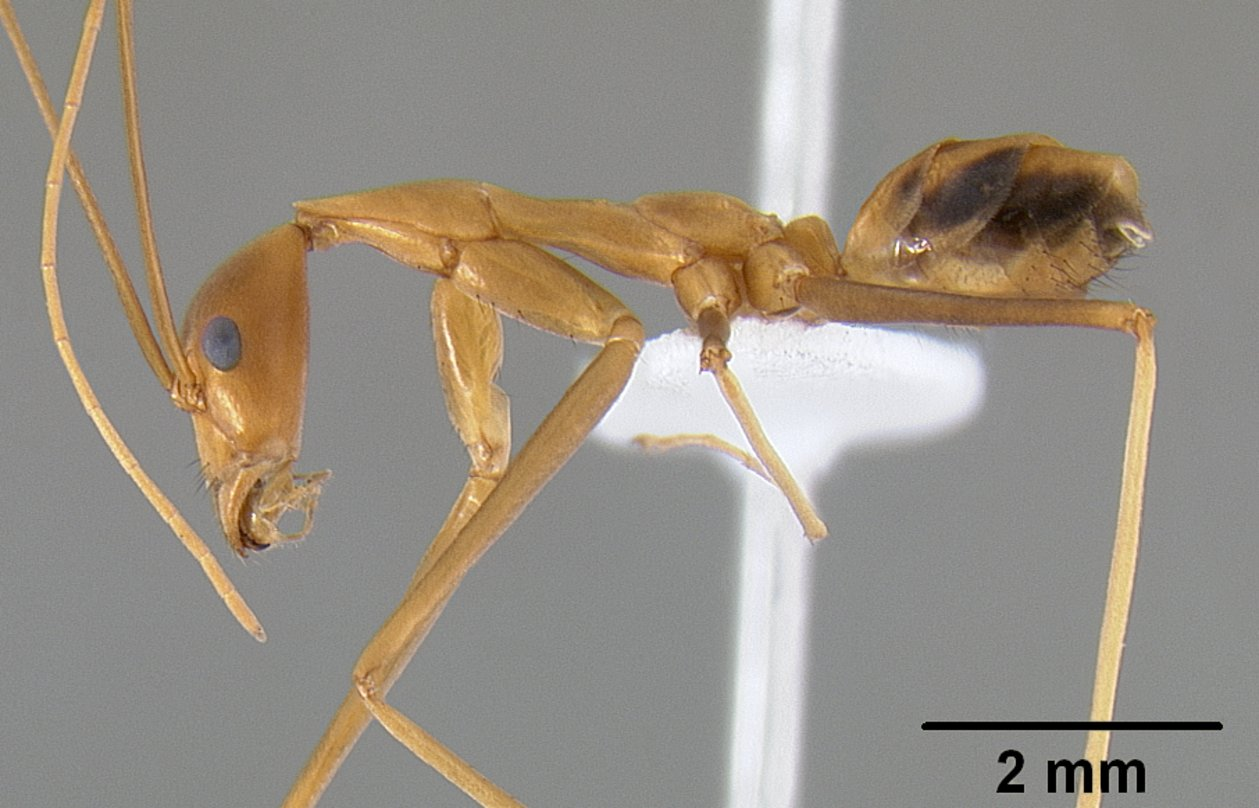

Scientific classification
- Kingdom: Animalia
- Phylum: Arthropoda
- Clade: Pancrustacea
- Class: Insecta
- Order: Hymenoptera
- Family: Formicidae
- Subfamily: Dolichoderinae
- Genus: Leptomyrmex
- Species: L. fragilis

Binomial name
- Leptomyrmex fragilis (Smith, F., 1859)

Synonyms
- Leptomyrmex fragilis femorata Santschi, 1932; Leptomyrmex fragilis maculata Stitz, 1938; Leptomyrmex gracillimus Wheeler, W.M., 1934; Leptomyrmex wheeleri Donisthorpe, 1948

= Leptomyrmex fragilis =

Species of ant

Leptomyrmex fragilis is a species of ant in the genus Leptomyrmex, commonly called ‘spider ants’. Described by Smith in 1859, the species is endemic to Indonesia and New Guinea and the Philippines.
