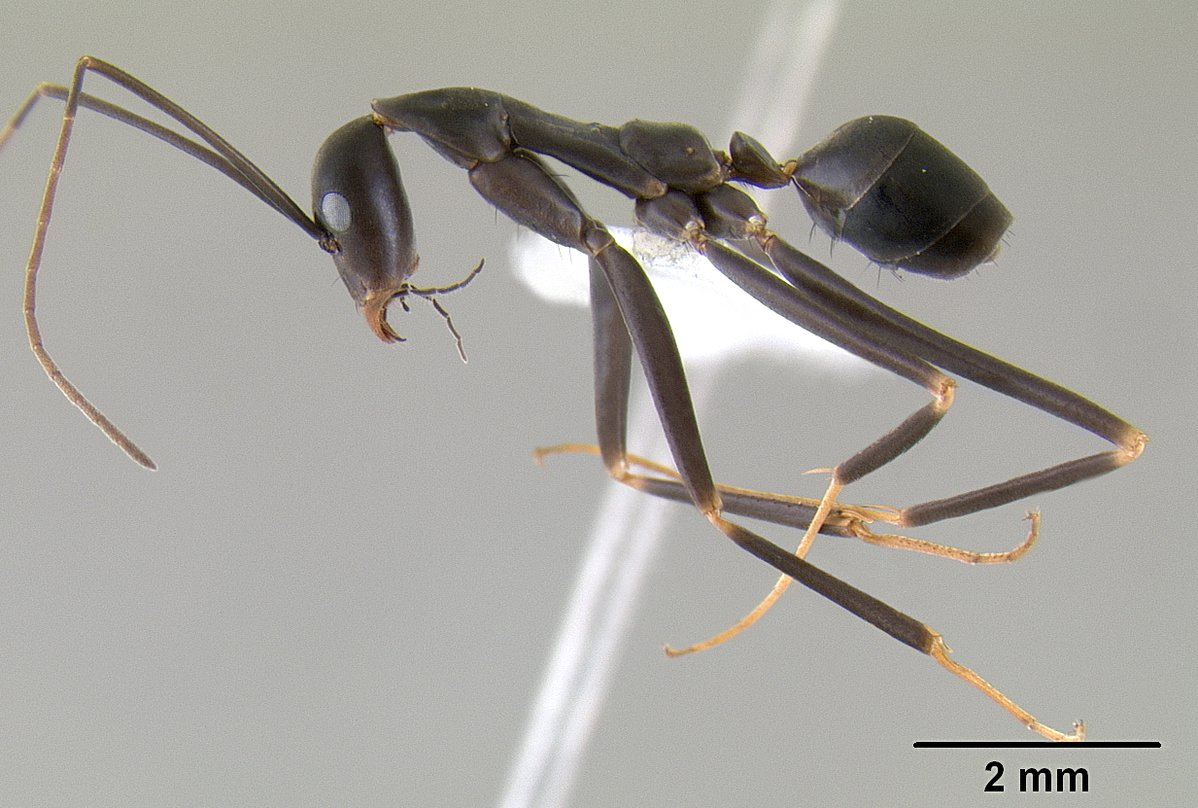

Scientific classification
- Kingdom: Animalia
- Phylum: Arthropoda
- Clade: Pancrustacea
- Class: Insecta
- Order: Hymenoptera
- Family: Formicidae
- Subfamily: Dolichoderinae
- Genus: Leptomyrmex
- Species: L. mjobergi

Binomial name
- Leptomyrmex mjobergi Forel, 1915

= Leptomyrmex mjobergi =

Species of ant

Leptomyrmex mjobergi is a species of ant in the genus Leptomyrmex. Described by Auguste-Henri Forel in 1915, the species is endemic to Australia.
