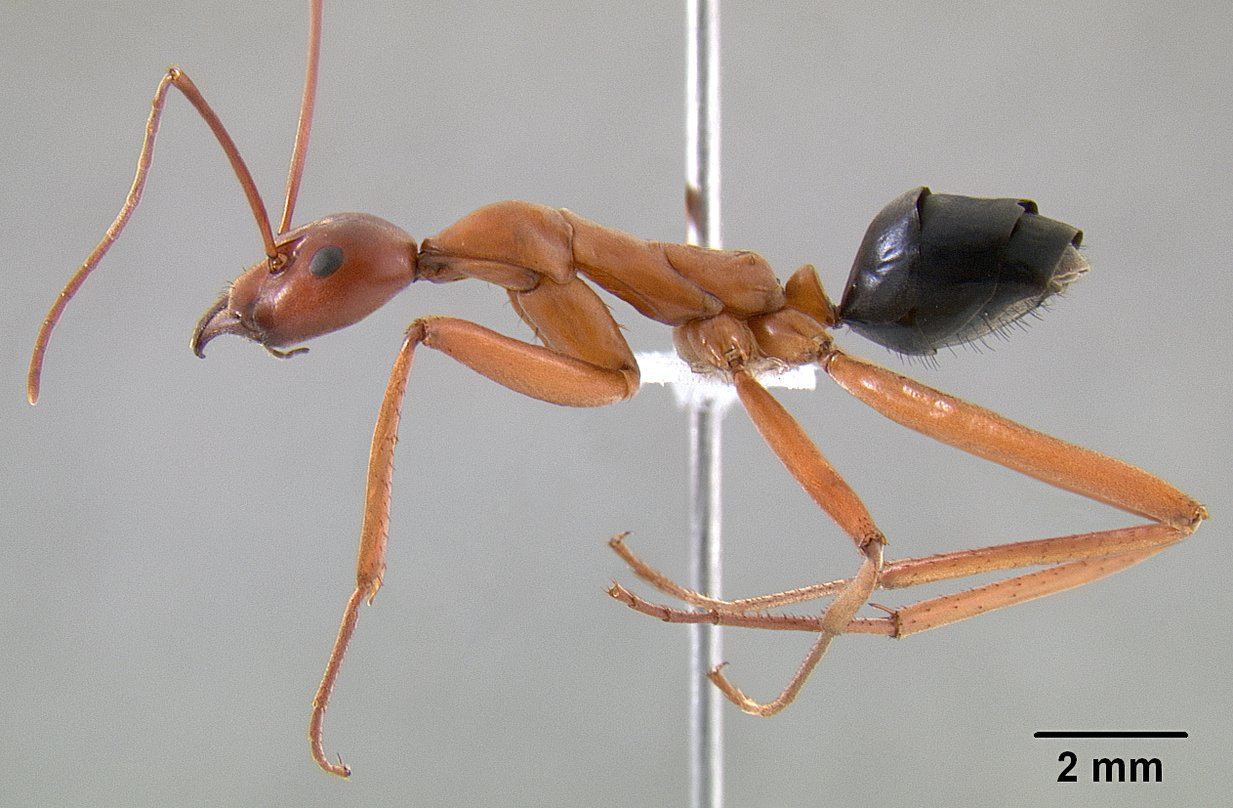

Scientific classification
- Kingdom: Animalia
- Phylum: Arthropoda
- Clade: Pancrustacea
- Class: Insecta
- Order: Hymenoptera
- Family: Formicidae
- Subfamily: Dolichoderinae
- Genus: Leptomyrmex
- Species: L. nigriventris

Binomial name
- Leptomyrmex nigriventris (Guérin-Méneville, 1831)

= Leptomyrmex nigriventris =

Species of ant

Leptomyrmex nigriventris is a species of ant in the genus Leptomyrmex. Described by Félix Édouard Guérin-Méneville in 1831, the species is endemic to Australia.
