= Leptomyrmex ruficeps =

Scientific classification
- Kingdom: Animalia
- Phylum: Arthropoda
- Clade: Pancrustacea
- Class: Insecta
- Order: Hymenoptera
- Family: Formicidae
- Subfamily: Dolichoderinae
- Genus: Leptomyrmex
- Species: L. ruficeps

Binomial name
- Leptomyrmex ruficeps Emery, 1895

Species of ant

Leptomyrmex ruficeps is a species of ant in the genus Leptomyrmex. Described by Carlo Emery in 1895, the species is endemic to Australia.
