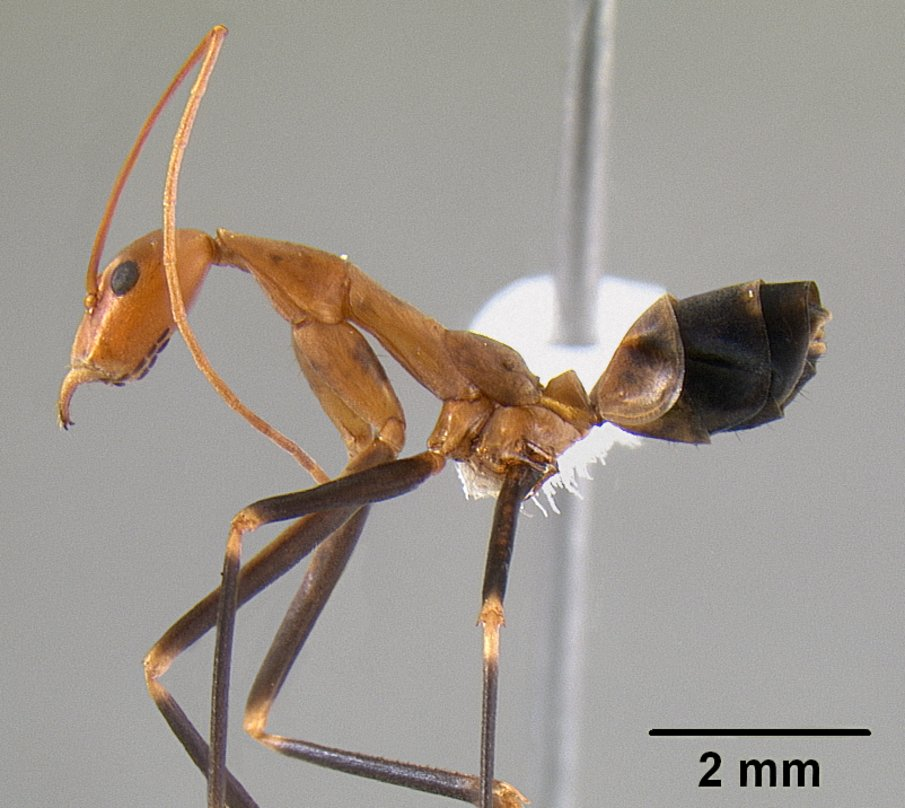
- L. darlingtoni worker from Australia

Scientific classification
- Kingdom: Animalia
- Phylum: Arthropoda
- Clade: Pancrustacea
- Class: Insecta
- Order: Hymenoptera
- Family: Formicidae
- Subfamily: Dolichoderinae
- Tribe: Leptomyrmecini
- Genus: Leptomyrmex; Mayr, 1862

Type species
- Formica erythrocephala

Diversity
- 28 species

= Leptomyrmex =

Genus of ants

Leptomyrmex, or spider ants, is a genus of ants and a distinctive member of the ant subfamily Dolichoderinae. Commonly known as "spider ants" for their long legs and spider-like movements, these orange and black ants are prominent residents of intact wet forest and sclerophyll habitats throughout their range. One extant species, Leptomyrmex relictus, is known from central Brazil; otherwise, the global distribution of this genus is restricted to eastern Australia, New Caledonia and New Guinea, as well as the nearby Indonesian islands of Aru and Seram.

Newly hatched Extatosoma tiaratum stick insects mimic these ants to avoid predation.

Workers of Leptomyrmex can be easily recognized by elongate antennal scapes which surpass the posterior margin of the head by more than one half their length, a medially notched hypostoma, mandibles with 7–15 teeth and 5–12 denticles, and a laterally located anterior tentorial pit.

Queens are known from only seven species. All known macro-Leptomyrmex queens are wingless (ergatoid). They can be differentiated from workers by the presence of ocelli and their larger size, including enlarged mesosoma and gaster. Whereas the workers possess a mesosoma that is smooth in profile, the profile of queens is distinctly impressed at the promesonotal suture and the metanotal groove. Appendages are noticeably stouter. Queens of at least one micro-Leptomyrmex species possess wings.

== Species groups ==
The species are informally split into two groups: the macro-Leptomyrmex (21 species), and its sister group, the micro-Leptomyrmex (six species). Macro-Leptomyrmex are large, diurnal and many are conspicuously colored in black, orange or bicolorous black and orange. Micro-Leptomyrmex species have been recently described from Australia, and were placed in Leptomyrmex based on mandibular dentition, anterior clypeal margin configuration, elongate scapes and head, cleft medial hypostomal margin, anterior tentorial pit location, keeled fourth gastral sternite and reduced hind tibial spurs. In some cases, scapes are shorter than in the macro species, and in one species (L. ramorniensis) the hypostoma is only weakly notched. All six species are readily distinguished from their larger congeners by their small size (head width < 0.80mm), brown coloration, relatively short dorsal face of the propodeum, angular (not rounded) petiole and gaster lacking lateral compression. All micro species occur in eastern Australian rainforests.

Micro-Leptomyrmex

- Leptomyrmex aitchisoni
- Leptomyrmex burwelli
- Leptomyrmex dolichoscapus
- Leptomyrmex garretti
- Leptomyrmex pilosus
- Leptomyrmex ramorniensis

Macro-Leptomyrmex

- Leptomyrmex cnemidatus
- Leptomyrmex darlingtoni
- Leptomyrmex erythrocephalus
- Leptomyrmex flavitarsus
- Leptomyrmex fragilis
- Leptomyrmex geniculatus
- Leptomyrmex melanoticus
- Leptomyrmex mjobergi
- †Leptomyrmex neotropicus
- Leptomyrmex niger
- Leptomyrmex nigriceps
- Leptomyrmex nigriventris
- Leptomyrmex pallens
- Leptomyrmex puberulus
- Leptomyrmex rothneyi
- Leptomyrmex ruficeps
- Leptomyrmex rufipes
- Leptomyrmex rufithorax
- Leptomyrmex tibialis
- Leptomyrmex unicolor
- Leptomyrmex varians
- Leptomyrmex wiburdi

== Evolution ==
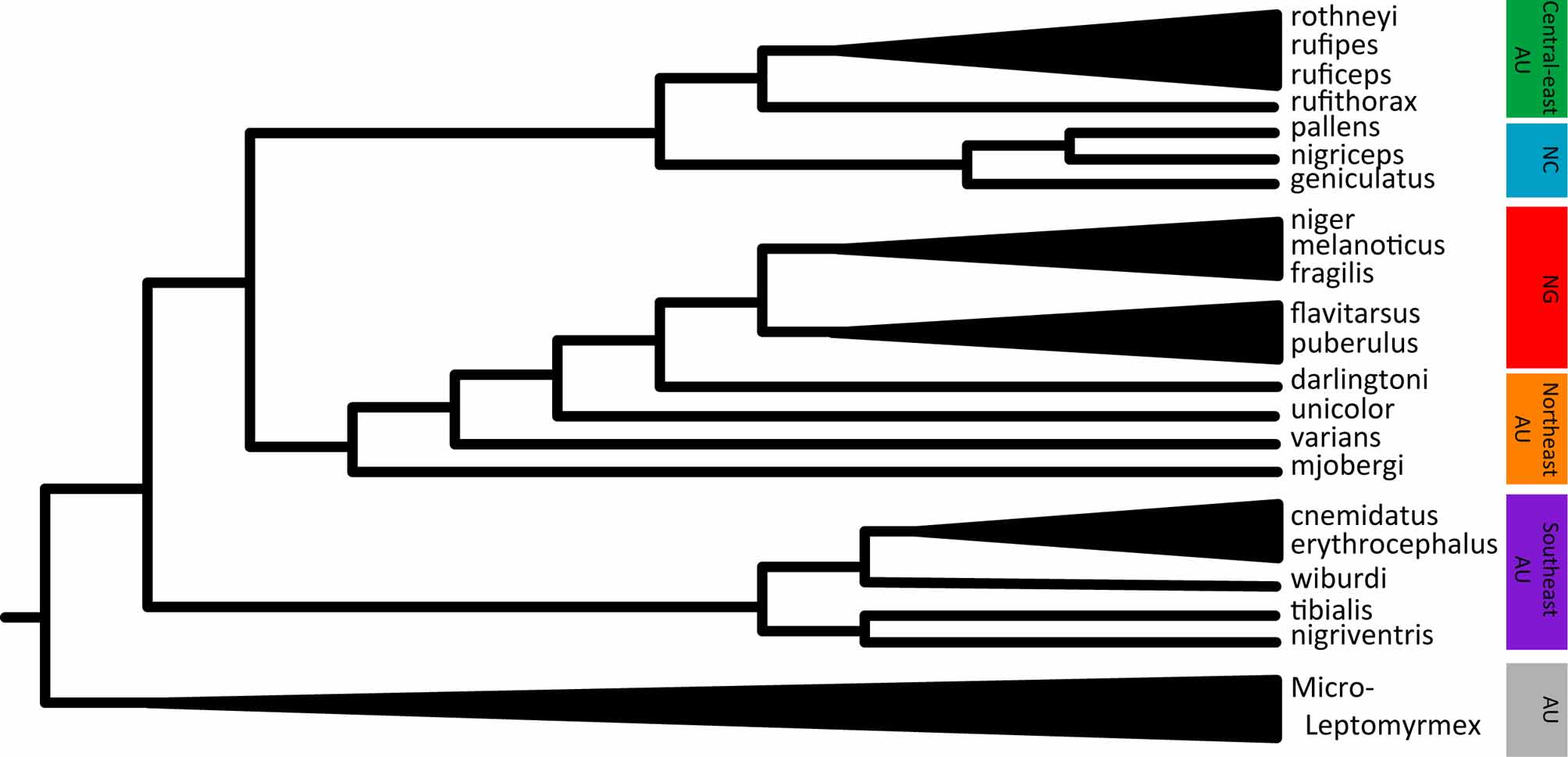
Simplified cladogram depicting relationships within the genus Leptomyrmex. Triangles represent species complexes not fully resolved by molecular phylogenetic analyses; AU = Australia, NC = New Caledonia, NG = New Guinea.

With exception of the South American species Leptomyrmex relictus, the Leptomyrmex species are currently confined to eastern Australia and several nearby Pacific islands. However, the discovery of fossil specimens from the Dominican Republic (20 my) and a supposedly related genus, Leptomyrmula, from Sicily (30 my) led Wilson to describe the evolutionary history of this genus as a "considerable biogeographic anomaly". The assertion that extant species of Leptomyrmex are relicts of a lineage once widespread across the globe that have survived in the tropical refuges of Australasia, is compelling, and similar biogeographic patterns are seen in other so-called "relictual" lineages in Australia, New Guinea and New Caledonia (among them the ant subfamily Myrmeciinae).

The sister group relationship of the winged micro-Leptomyrmex to the wingless macro- clade suggests that the loss of wings may have occurred relatively recently in this lineage, and that stem lineages may not necessarily have been wingless. These observations, in addition to the fact that the sister group of Leptomyrmex (i.e., (Forelius + Dorymyrmex)) also has winged queens, may help explain the proposed widespread former distribution. On the other hand, a recent molecular phylogenetic analysis of the Dolichoderinae places Leptomyrmex firmly within a clade of species (tribe Leptomyrmecini) whose origins appears to be in the Neotropics, with two main dispersal events to Australia. This suggests that the Sicilian fossil Leptomyrmula is not part of this group.
