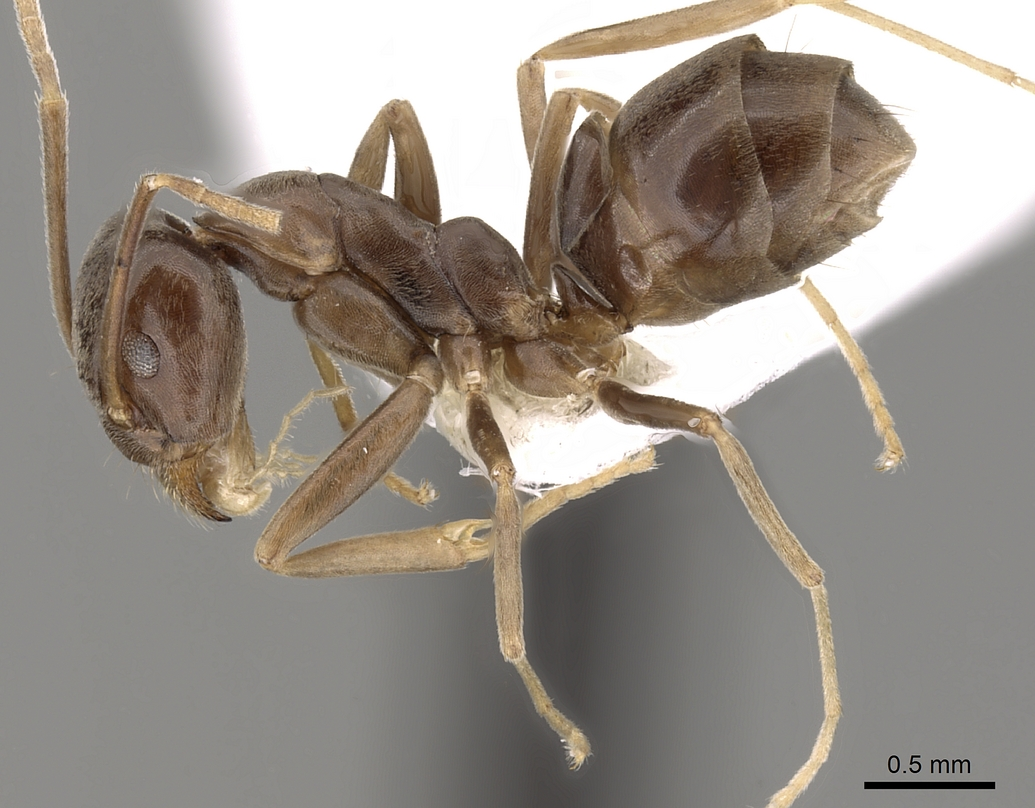
- Leptomyrmex ramorniensi worker

Scientific classification
- Kingdom: Animalia
- Phylum: Arthropoda
- Clade: Pancrustacea
- Class: Insecta
- Order: Hymenoptera
- Family: Formicidae
- Subfamily: Dolichoderinae
- Genus: Leptomyrmex
- Species: L. ramorniensis

Binomial name
- Leptomyrmex ramorniensis Smith & Shattuck, 2009

= Leptomyrmex ramorniensis =

Species of ant

Leptomyrmex ramorniensis is a species of ant in the genus Leptomyrmex.
