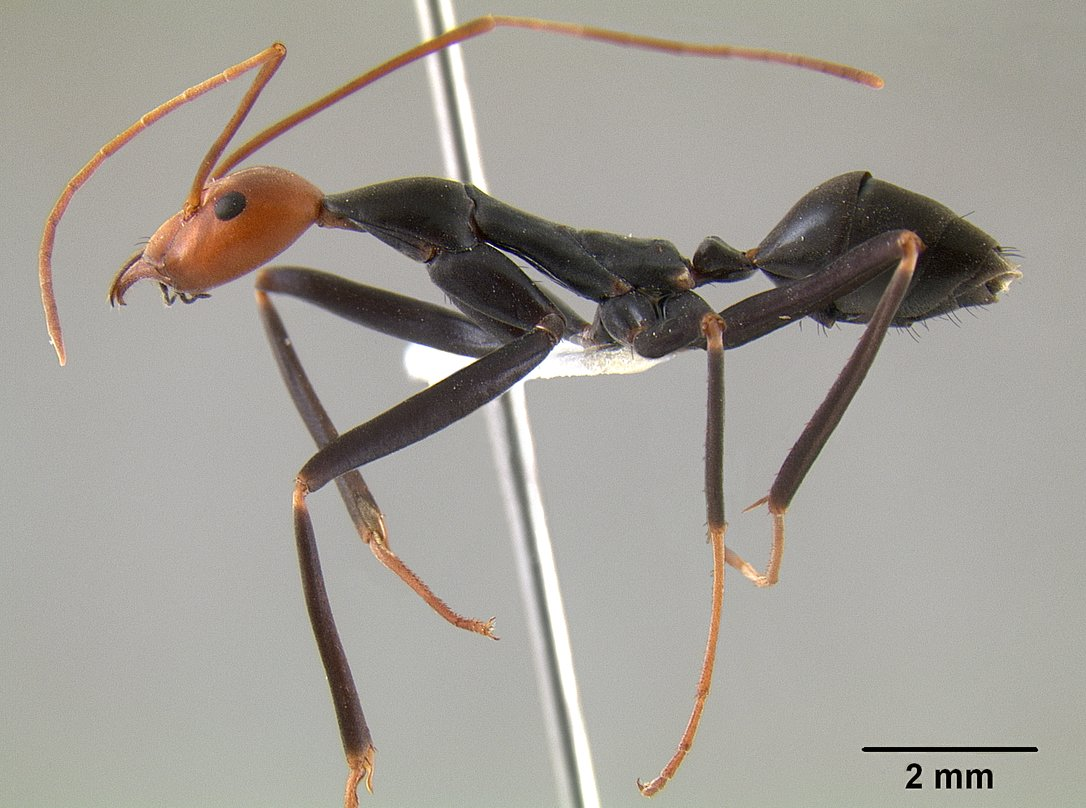

Scientific classification
- Kingdom: Animalia
- Phylum: Arthropoda
- Clade: Pancrustacea
- Class: Insecta
- Order: Hymenoptera
- Family: Formicidae
- Subfamily: Dolichoderinae
- Genus: Leptomyrmex
- Species: L. erythrocephalus

Binomial name
- Leptomyrmex erythrocephalus (Fabricius, 1775)

Synonyms
- Leptomyrmex erythrocephalus clarki Wheeler, W.M., 1934; Leptomyrmex erythrocephalus mandibularis Wheeler, W.M., 1915; Leptomyrmex erythrocephalus unctus Wheeler, W.M., 1934; Leptomyrmex froggatti Forel, 1910

= Leptomyrmex erythrocephalus =

Species of ant

Leptomyrmex erythrocephalus is a species of ant in the genus Leptomyrmex. Described by Johan Christian Fabricius in 1775, the species is endemic to Australia and is known as the red-headed spider ant.
