= Leptomyrmex rothneyi =

Scientific classification
- Kingdom: Animalia
- Phylum: Arthropoda
- Clade: Pancrustacea
- Class: Insecta
- Order: Hymenoptera
- Family: Formicidae
- Subfamily: Dolichoderinae
- Genus: Leptomyrmex
- Species: L. rothneyi

Binomial name
- Leptomyrmex rothneyi Forel, 1902

Species of ant

Leptomyrmex rothneyi is a species of ant in the genus Leptomyrmex. Described by Auguste-Henri Forel in 1902, the species is endemic to Australia. It is named after the collector George Alexander James Rothney.
