= Leptomyrmex niger =

Scientific classification
- Kingdom: Animalia
- Phylum: Arthropoda
- Clade: Pancrustacea
- Class: Insecta
- Order: Hymenoptera
- Family: Formicidae
- Subfamily: Dolichoderinae
- Genus: Leptomyrmex
- Species: L. niger

Binomial name
- Leptomyrmex niger Emery, 1900

Synonyms
- Leptomyrmex lugubris Wheeler, W.M., 1934

Species of ant

Leptomyrmex niger is a species of ant in the genus Leptomyrmex. Described by Carlo Emery in 1900, the species is endemic to New Guinea.
