= Leptomyrmex dolichoscapus =

Scientific classification
- Kingdom: Animalia
- Phylum: Arthropoda
- Clade: Pancrustacea
- Class: Insecta
- Order: Hymenoptera
- Family: Formicidae
- Subfamily: Dolichoderinae
- Genus: Leptomyrmex
- Species: L. dolichoscapus

Binomial name
- Leptomyrmex dolichoscapus Smith, D. J. & Shattuck, S. O., 2009

Species of ant

Leptomyrmex dolichoscapus is a species of ant in the genus Leptomyrmex.
