= Leptomyrmex neotropicus =

Leptomyrmex neotropicus Temporal range: Early Miocene Dominican amber

Scientific classification
- Domain: Eukaryota
- Kingdom: Animalia
- Phylum: Arthropoda
- Class: Insecta
- Order: Hymenoptera
- Family: Formicidae
- Subfamily: Dolichoderinae
- Genus: Leptomyrmex
- Species: †L. neotropicus

Binomial name
- †Leptomyrmex neotropicus Baroni Urbani, 1980

Species of ant

Leptomyrmex neotropicus is an extinct species of Miocene ant in the genus Leptomyrmex. Described by Baroni Urbani in 1980, a total of 10 workers of this species were found in a single block of Dominican amber.
