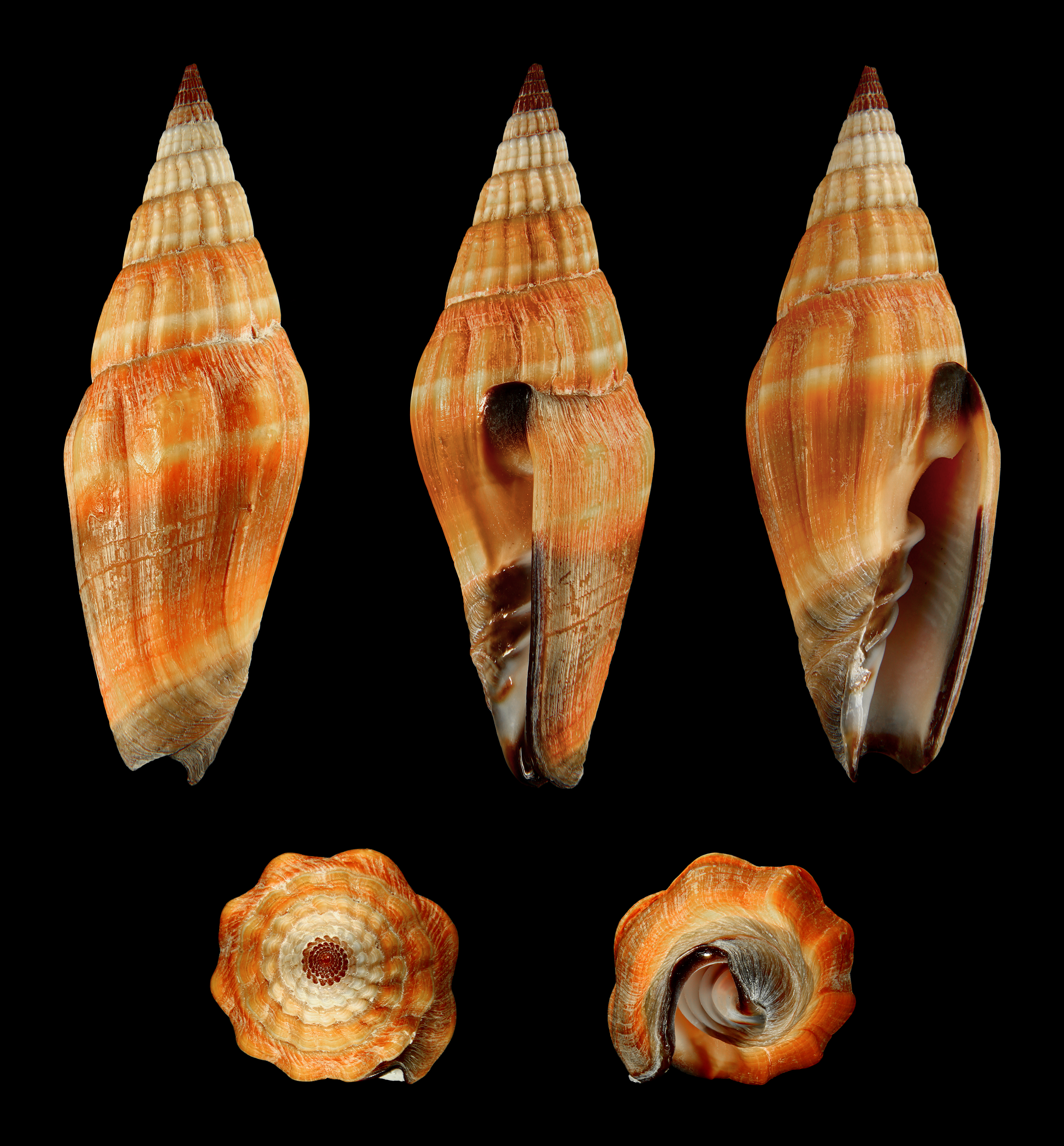
- Vexillum vulpecula

Scientific classification
- Kingdom: Animalia
- Phylum: Mollusca
- Class: Gastropoda
- Subclass: Caenogastropoda
- Order: Neogastropoda
- Superfamily: Turbinelloidea
- Family: Costellariidae
- Genus: Vexillum
- Species: V. vulpecula

Binomial name
- Vexillum vulpecula (Linnaeus, 1758)

Synonyms *
- Mitra vulpecula Linnaeus, 1758; Vexillum superbum Röding, P.F., 1798; Mitra bifasciata Swainson, 1821; Mitra zonalis Quoy, J.R.C. & J.P. Gaimard, 1833; Mitra crispata Küster, 1840; Mitra nodosa Swainson, W.A., 1840; Vexillum plicatissima Küster, H.C., 1840; Mitra staminea Dall, W.H., 1905; Vexillum pervariabilis Dautzenberg, Ph., 1935; Vexillum rugata Dautzenberg, Ph., 1935; Vexillum simulans Dautzenberg, Ph., 1935

= Vexillum vulpecula =

Species of gastropod

Vexillum vulpecula (common name: the Little Fox Mitre) is a species of small sea snail, a marine gastropod mollusk in the family Costellariidae, the ribbed miters.

== Description ==
The shell size varies between 27 mm and 72 mm.

The shell is stoutly fusiform with a high spire. The spire is acuminated. The seven whorls are transversely impressly striated with narrow spiral grooves, sometimes smooth towards the upper part and longitudinally ribbed. The ribs are rude, obtuse, of the body whorl sometimes indistinct. The ribs become strong at the angular shoulder. The suture is channeled. The outer lip is slightly concave and lirate within. The shell is whitish or yellowish-orange, more or less banded with brown, sometimes encircled with pale reddish fillets. The base and apex are blackish. The white columella is four-plaited, stained at the upper part with black.

== Distribution ==
This species occurs in the Indo-West Pacific near Madagascar and Mozambique and in the Pacific Ocean the Philippines, Fiji and Okinawa; also off New Caledonia and Australia (Northern Territory, Queensland, Western Australia).
