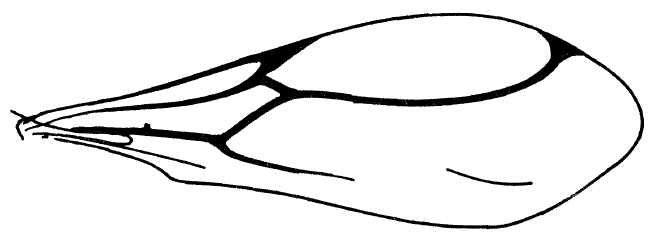
- Leptomyrmula maravignae wing

Scientific classification
- Domain: Eukaryota
- Kingdom: Animalia
- Phylum: Arthropoda
- Class: Insecta
- Order: Hymenoptera
- Family: Formicidae
- Subfamily: Dolichoderinae
- Tribe: incertae sedis
- Genus: †Leptomyrmula; Emery, 1913
- Species: †L. maravignae

Binomial name
- †Leptomyrmula maravignae Emery, 1891

= Leptomyrmula =

Genus of ants

Leptomyrmula is an extinct genus of ants of the subfamily Dolichoderinae. It contains a single described species Leptomyrmula maravignae, which was described before the genus existed in 1891.
