= Australian Faunal Directory =

Australian faunal database of taxon names and bibliographic data

The Australian Faunal Directory is an online catalogue of taxonomic and biological information on all animal species known to occur within Australia. It is a database produced by the Department of Climate Change, Energy, the Environment and Water of the Government of Australia. By 12 May 2021, the directory had collected information on about 126,442 species and subspecies. It includes the data from the discontinued Zoological Catalogue of Australia and is regularly updated. Started in the 1980s, its goal is compile a "list of all Australian fauna including terrestrial vertebrates, ants and marine fauna" and create an "Australian biotaxonomic information system".
