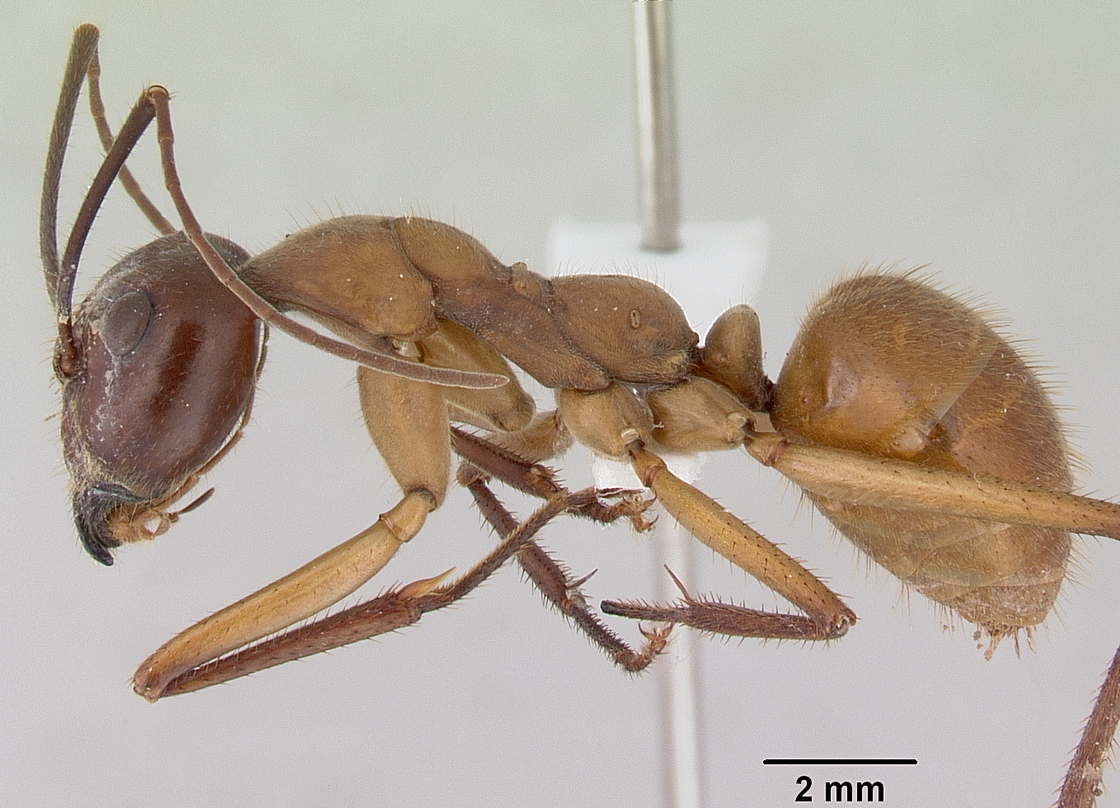

Scientific classification
- Kingdom: Animalia
- Phylum: Arthropoda
- Class: Insecta
- Order: Hymenoptera
- Family: Formicidae
- Subfamily: Formicinae
- Genus: Notostigma
- Species: N. foreli

Binomial name
- Notostigma foreli Emery, 1920

= Notostigma foreli =

Species of ant

Notostigma foreli is a species of ant belonging to the genus Notostigma, which is native to Australia. It was described by Emery in 1920.
