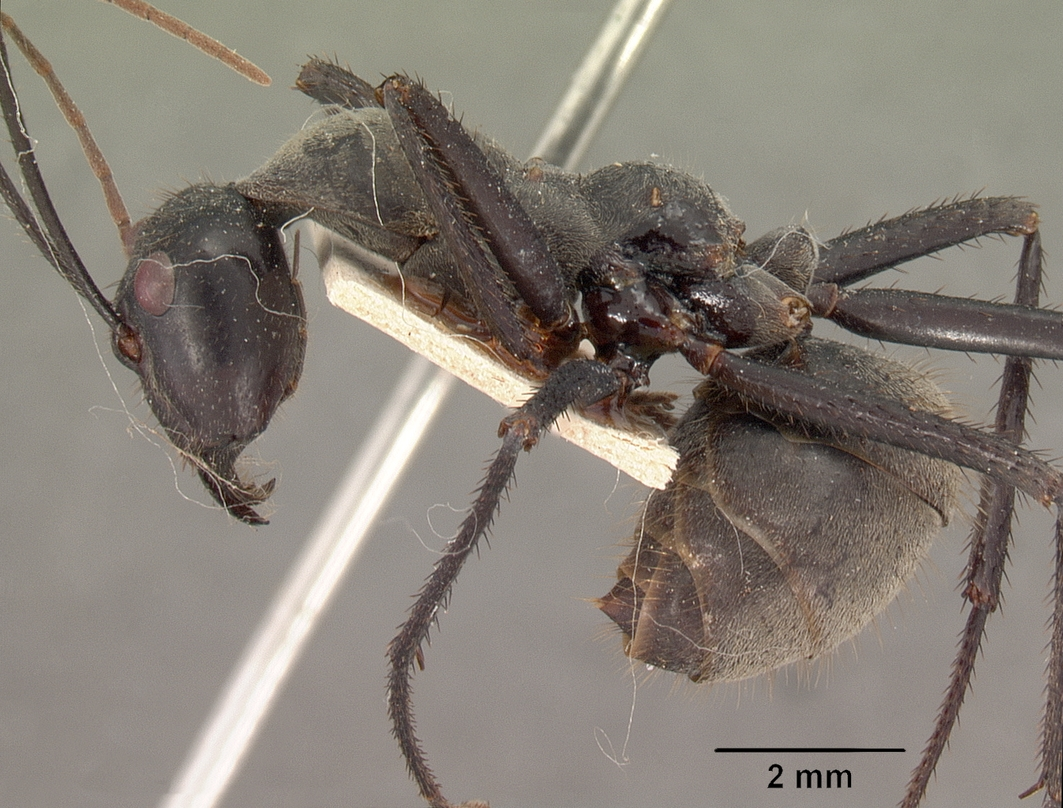

Scientific classification
- Kingdom: Animalia
- Phylum: Arthropoda
- Class: Insecta
- Order: Hymenoptera
- Family: Formicidae
- Subfamily: Formicinae
- Genus: Notostigma
- Species: N. carazzii

Binomial name
- Notostigma carazzii (Emery, 1895)

Synonyms
- Camponotus podenzanai (Emery, 1895)

= Notostigma carazzii =

Species of ant

Notostigma carazzii is a species of ant belonging to the genus Notostigma. The ant was first described by Carlo Emery in 1895. The species is endemic to Australia. Specimens are mainly found in the state of Queensland, and foraging workers are solitarily and nocturnal.

A journal article by George Wheeler observed the larvae of the species. Lengths for very young larva is 3.7 mm, young larva 5.4–10.2 mm, immature larvae around 8.7–10.3 mm and mature larvae grow to lengths of 8.3–15.4 mm.
