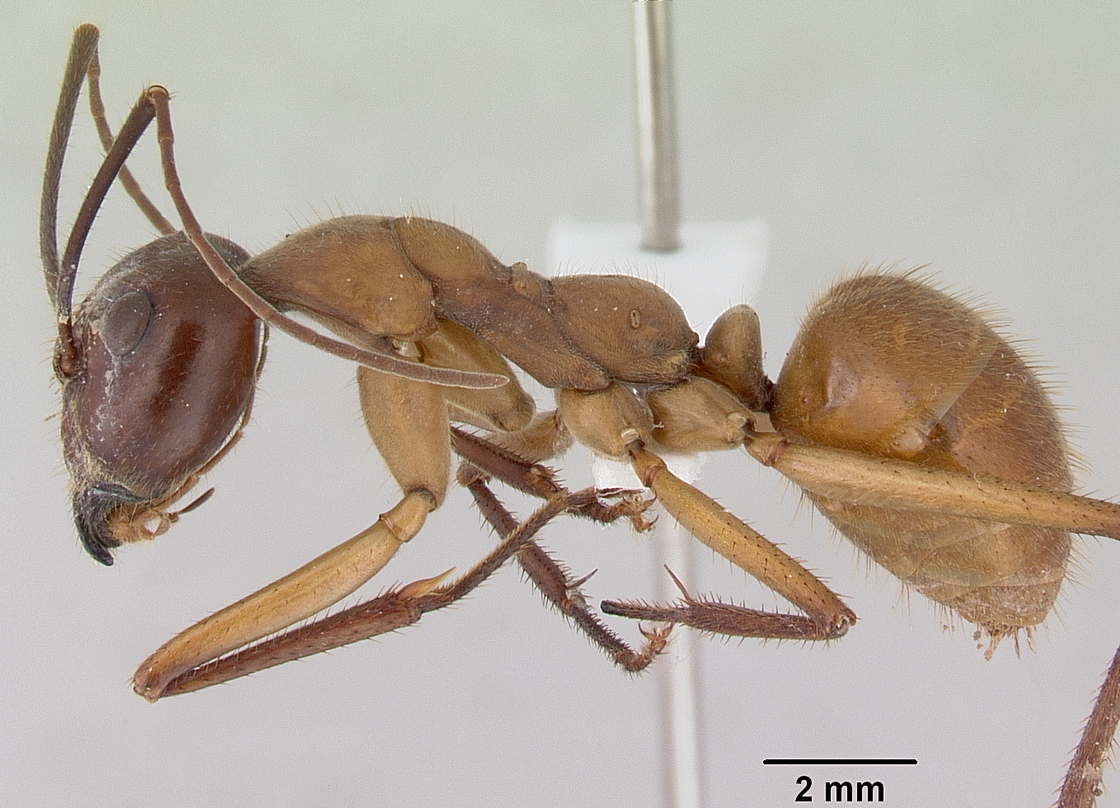
- Notostigma foreli worker

Scientific classification
- Kingdom: Animalia
- Phylum: Arthropoda
- Class: Insecta
- Order: Hymenoptera
- Family: Formicidae
- Subfamily: Formicinae
- Tribe: Melophorini
- Genus: Notostigma; Emery, 1920

Type species
- Camponotus carazzii

Diversity
- 2 species

= Notostigma =

Genus of ants

Notostigma is a genus of ants in the subfamily Formicinae. Its two species are known only from Australia. Workers are nocturnal and forage solitarily. Notostigma was first described by Emery (1920), when he erected the new genus for three species of carpenter ants (Camponotus).

== Species ==
- Notostigma carazzii (Emery, 1895)
- Notostigma foreli (Emery, 1920)
