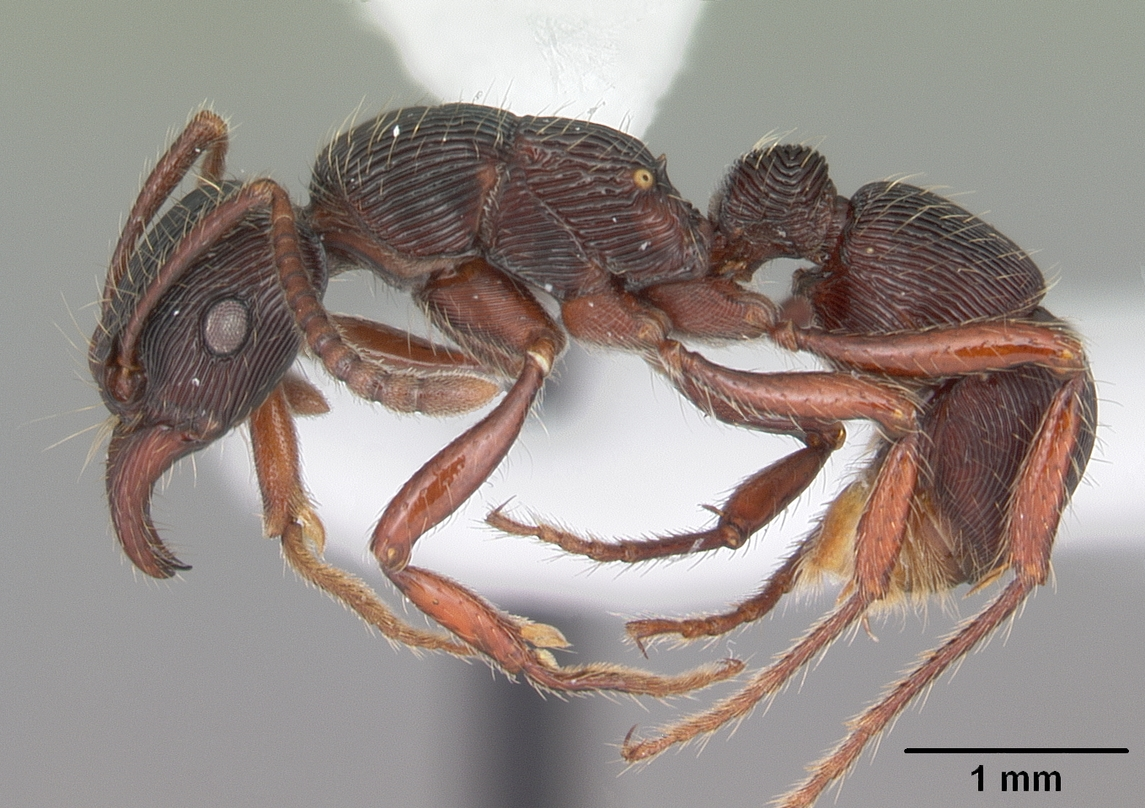
- Poneracantha triangularis worker from the United States

Scientific classification
- Kingdom: Animalia
- Phylum: Arthropoda
- Class: Insecta
- Order: Hymenoptera
- Family: Formicidae
- Genus: Poneracantha
- Species: P. triangularis

Binomial name
- Poneracantha triangularis (Mayr, 1887)

Synonyms
- Ectatomma triangulare Mayr, 1887

= Poneracantha triangularis =

Species of ant

Poneracantha triangularis is a Neotropical species of ant in the subfamily Ectatomminae. Native to the forests of South and Central America, P. triangularis is a predatory ant that feeds on millipedes. In its native range, this species is known from Buenos Aires, Argentina in the south to Costa Rica in the north, with records from eight countries in South America, and two countries of Central America. The first records of P. triangularis outside its native range came from Florida beginning in 1985 and Alabama in 1996.

Based on its South American range, it appears that P. triangularis has the potential to spread to forests throughout much of the southeastern United States. There are no documented impacts of P. triangularis, and it seems unlikely that this species will ever become a major pest.

== Taxonomy ==
Poneracantha triangularis was originally described by Gustav Mayr as Ectatomma triangulare in Uruguay in 1887. Junior synonyms include Ectatomma triangulare richteri, described in 1913 in Argentina and Ectatomma aculeaticoxae, described from Haute Carsevenne, French Guiana in 1921 (now Alto Rio Calçoene, Brazil). It was classified under Gnamptogenys for a time, until Camacho et al, 2022 separated this species from Gnamptogenys into a previously synonymized genus Poneracantha.

== Description ==
Poneracantha triangularis is a relatively large, black ant with more reddish legs that is characterized by deep longitudinal grooves and ridges that the run the lengths of the head, mesosoma and gaster. Little is known about the ecology of the ant, other than that it is believed to be a millipede specialist and is associated with humid forests and arboreal foraging.

Poneracantha triangularis and Gnamptogenys hartmani are the only two members of the subfamily Ectatomminae known to occur in the southeastern United States. These very distinctive ants can be recognized immediately by the deep horizontal grooves covering the entire head and body. P. triangularis workers are ~5.0 mm in length and dark brown. Females are similar in appearance to workers, but are slightly larger (~5.5 mm in length) and have brownish gray colored wings. Males are approximately the same length as females (~5.5 mm), but are wasp-like in appearance and differ considerably from workers and females. The deep horizontal grooves characteristic of the genus are mostly absent except on the face and first gastral tergite. Sides of head, pronotum, much of the mesonotum, and gaster have reduced sculpture and are shiny, and the remainder of mesosoma and petiole are rugoreticulate. Males are bicolored with the head and mesosoma dark reddish black to black, petiole dark reddish brown, and gaster reddish orange. The legs, antennal scape, and first segment of funiculus are orangish red, the remainder of funiculus is gray, and the wings are dusky gray. In comparison, Gnamptogenys hartmani workers are 3.5–4.0 mm and pale reddish brown. Females are ~5 mm and similar in appearance to workers. Males are approximately the same size as females, but horizontal grooves are greatly reduced, and overall they are shinier in appearance. The entire body is reddish brown, legs and scapes are yellowish brown, and the funiculus is dark colored.

== Distribution ==
Records of P. triangularis come from eight countries in South America (all except Chile, French Guiana, and Paraguay), and the two southernmost countries of Central America (Panama and Costa Rica). Because there are no discernible geographic barriers, it seems very likely that the native range of P. triangularis also extends into forest habitats in French Guiana, Paraguay, and farther north in Central America, but has not yet been recorded in these areas due to its rarity. In its exotic range, P. triangularis is now known from Florida, Alabama and Mississippi. Based on its South American range, it is possible that P. triangularis could spread to forests throughout much of the southeastern United States, perhaps as far north as Richmond, Virginia and Lexington, Kentucky].

In both its native and exotic ranges, P. triangularis inhabits forests and preys on millipedes. There are no known impacts of P. triangularis, even though if this species was having a localized impact on millipede populations, it seems unlikely that this would have been detected. Nonetheless, it seems unlikely that this species will ever become a major pest.
