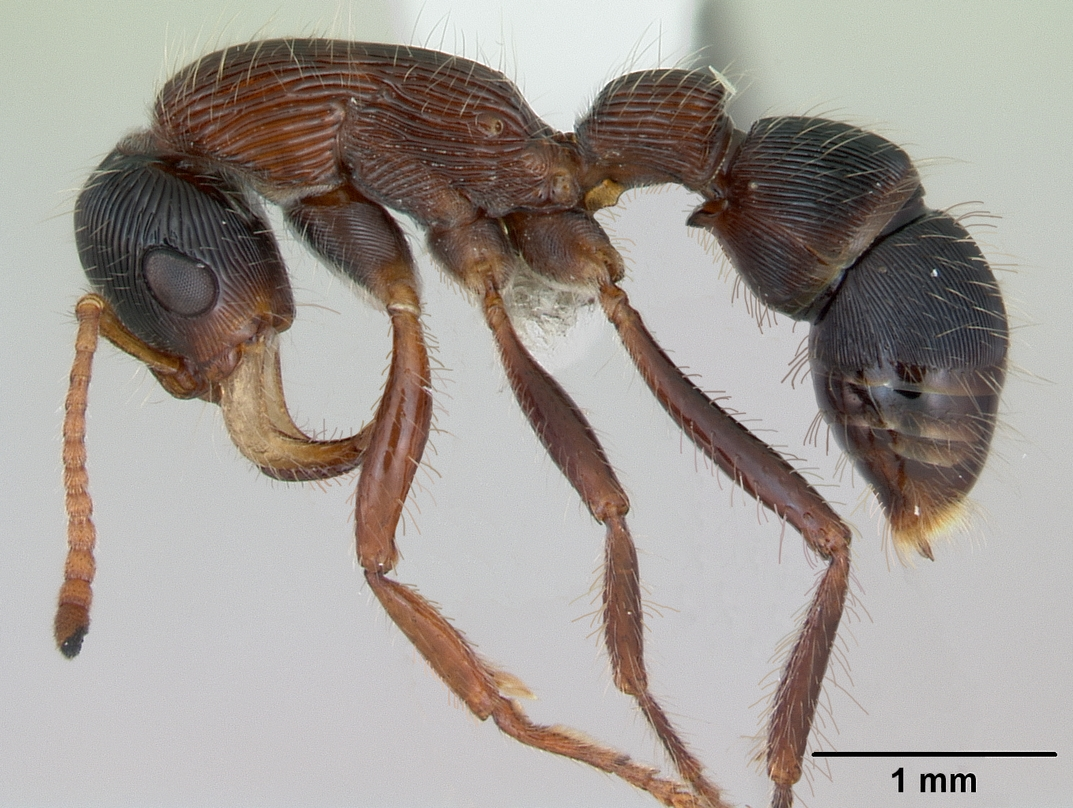

Scientific classification
- Kingdom: Animalia
- Phylum: Arthropoda
- Clade: Pancrustacea
- Class: Insecta
- Order: Hymenoptera
- Family: Formicidae
- Genus: Gnamptogenys
- Species: G. sulcata

Binomial name
- Gnamptogenys sulcata (Smith, 1858)

= Gnamptogenys sulcata =

Species of ant

Gnamptogenys sulcata is a species of ant in the genus Gnamptogenys. It is categorized in the tribe Ectatommini, and was first described by Smith in 1858. It usually inhabits tropical rainforests, gardens and low vegetation areas. It has been found at elevations of 2 to 1260 m s. n. m.
