= Alfaria =

The taxonomic name Alfaria may refer to:

- Alfaria (ant), a genus of ants
- Alfaria (fungus), a genus of fungi
