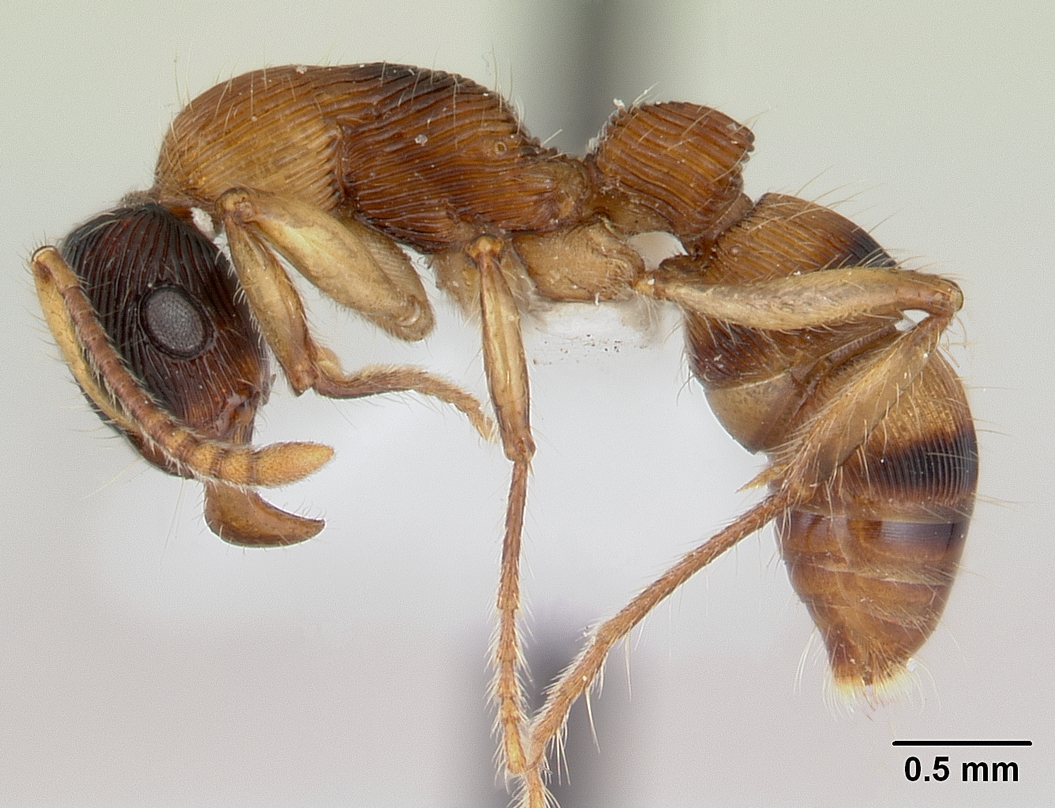

Scientific classification
- Kingdom: Animalia
- Phylum: Arthropoda
- Clade: Pancrustacea
- Class: Insecta
- Order: Hymenoptera
- Family: Formicidae
- Genus: Gnamptogenys
- Species: G. ericae

Binomial name
- Gnamptogenys ericae Forel, 1912

= Gnamptogenys ericae =

Species of ant

Gnamptogenys ericae is a species of ant in the subfamily Ectatomminae.

== Description ==
Gnamptogenys ericae has a black exoskeleton while the mandibles, legs, and antennae are dark brown. Its mandibles are subtriangular, and it has small metathorax.

== Range ==
Gnamptogenys ericae is found in Brazil, Colombia, French Guiana, Guyana, and Venezuela; or generally the neotropical region.

== Habitat ==
Gnamptogenys ericae is usually found in low vegetation in the rainforests of South America.
