= Boltonia =

Boltonia may refer to one of several organisms.

== Plants ==
- Boltonia (plant), a genus of plants

== Insects ==
- †Boltonia (insect), a genus of fossil insects in the order Palaeodictyoptera
- Bazboltonia, a genus of ants formerly known as Boltonia
