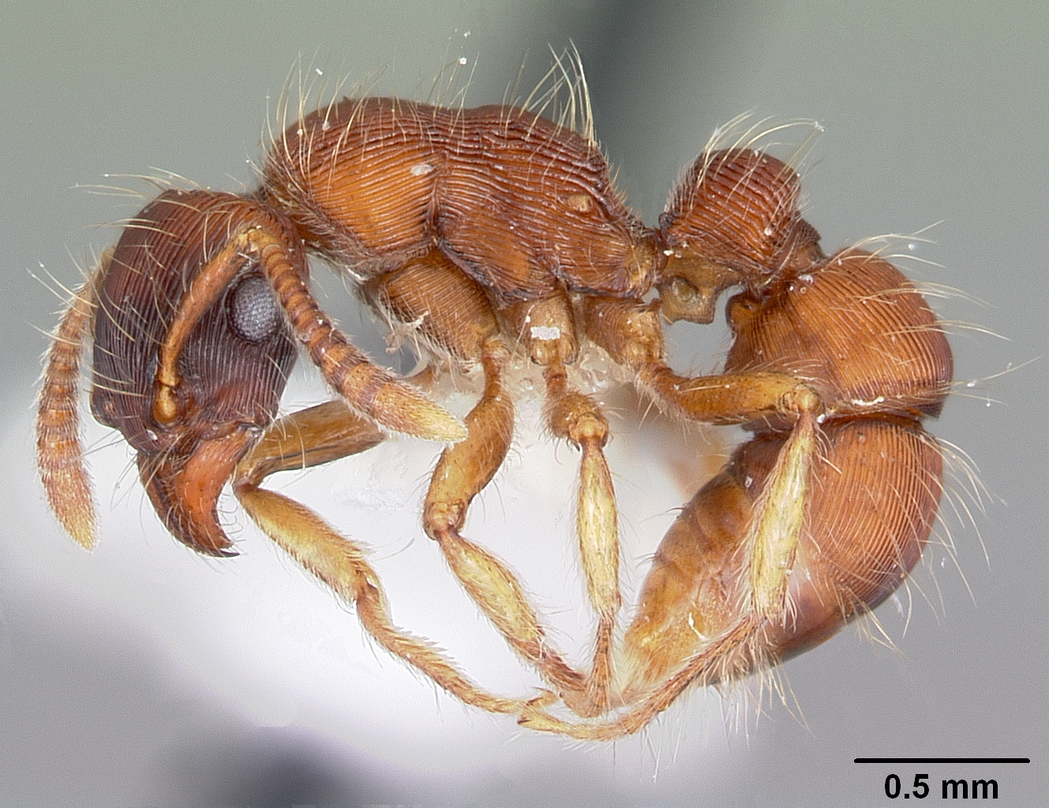

Scientific classification
- Domain: Eukaryota
- Kingdom: Animalia
- Phylum: Arthropoda
- Class: Insecta
- Order: Hymenoptera
- Family: Formicidae
- Genus: Gnamptogenys
- Species: G. hartmani

Binomial name
- Gnamptogenys hartmani (Wheeler, 1915)

= Gnamptogenys hartmani =

Species of ant

Gnamptogenys hartmani is a species of ectaheteromorph ant native to South America, Central America, Mexico, Texas, and Louisiana.
