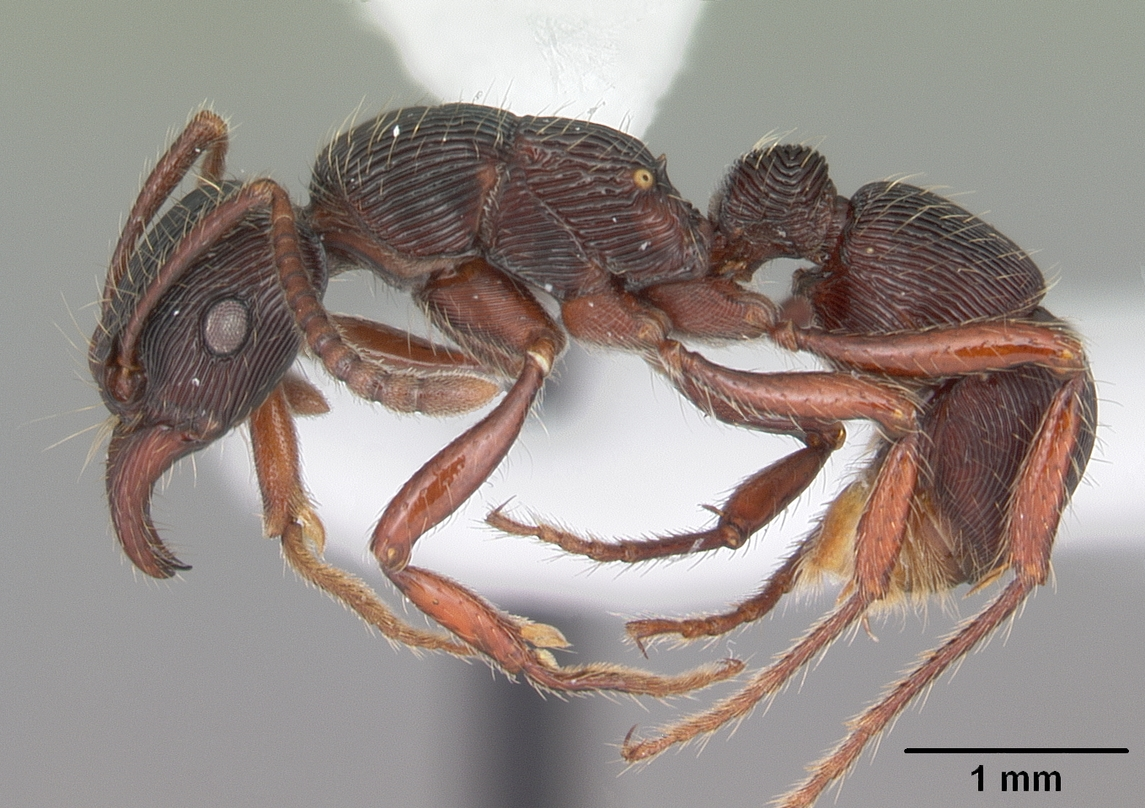
- Gnamptogenys triangularis worker

Scientific classification
- Kingdom: Animalia
- Phylum: Arthropoda
- Class: Insecta
- Order: Hymenoptera
- Family: Formicidae
- Subfamily: Ectatomminae
- Tribe: Ectatommini
- Genus: Gnamptogenys; Roger, 1863

Type species
- Ponera tornata (Roger, 1861)

Diversity
- 37 species

= Gnamptogenys =

Genus of insects

Gnamptogenys is a genus of ants in the subfamily Ectatomminae. The genus has a wide distribution. It is known to occur in the Nearctic, Neotropic, Indomalayan, and Australasian realms. Camacho et al, 2022 revised this genus, significantly reducing its size to only 32 valid extant species and 5 valid fossil species by splitting off most species into four formerly synonymized genera Alfaria, Holcoponera, Poneracantha, and Stictoponera.

== Species ==
As of 2024, Gnamptogenys contains 37 species, five of which are extinct. This genus originally contained 146 species, but Camacho et al. 2022 moved many species into other genera.

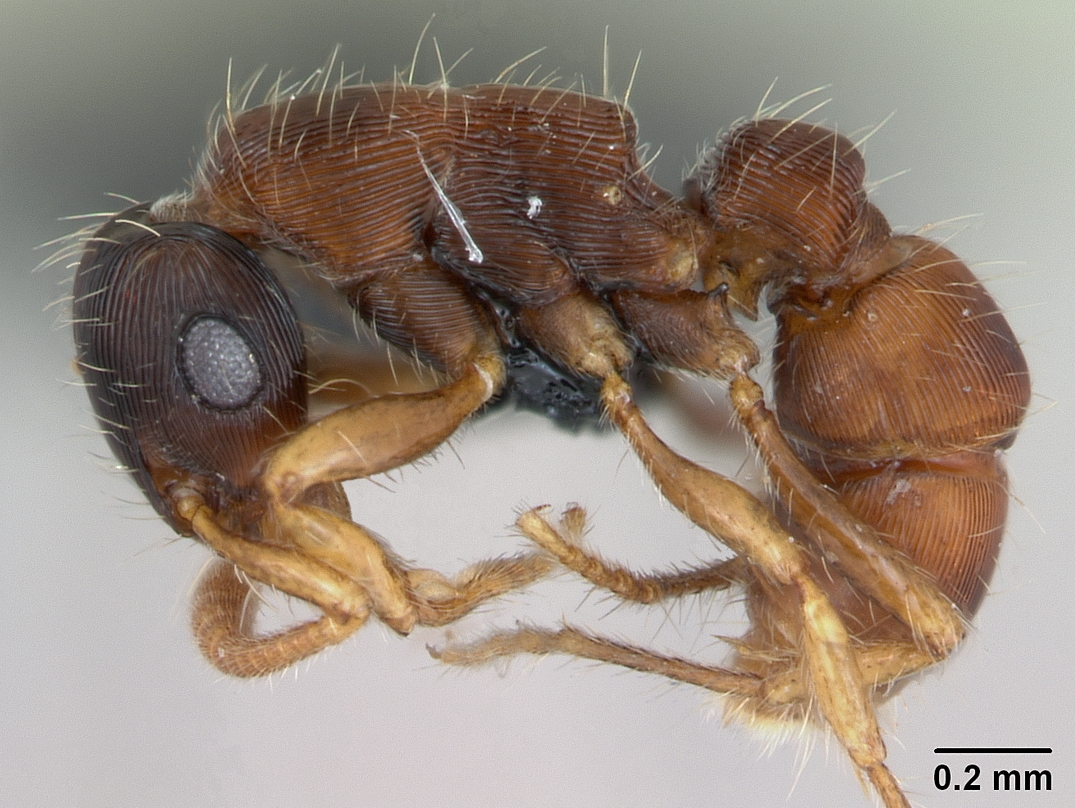
Gnamptogenys bruchi

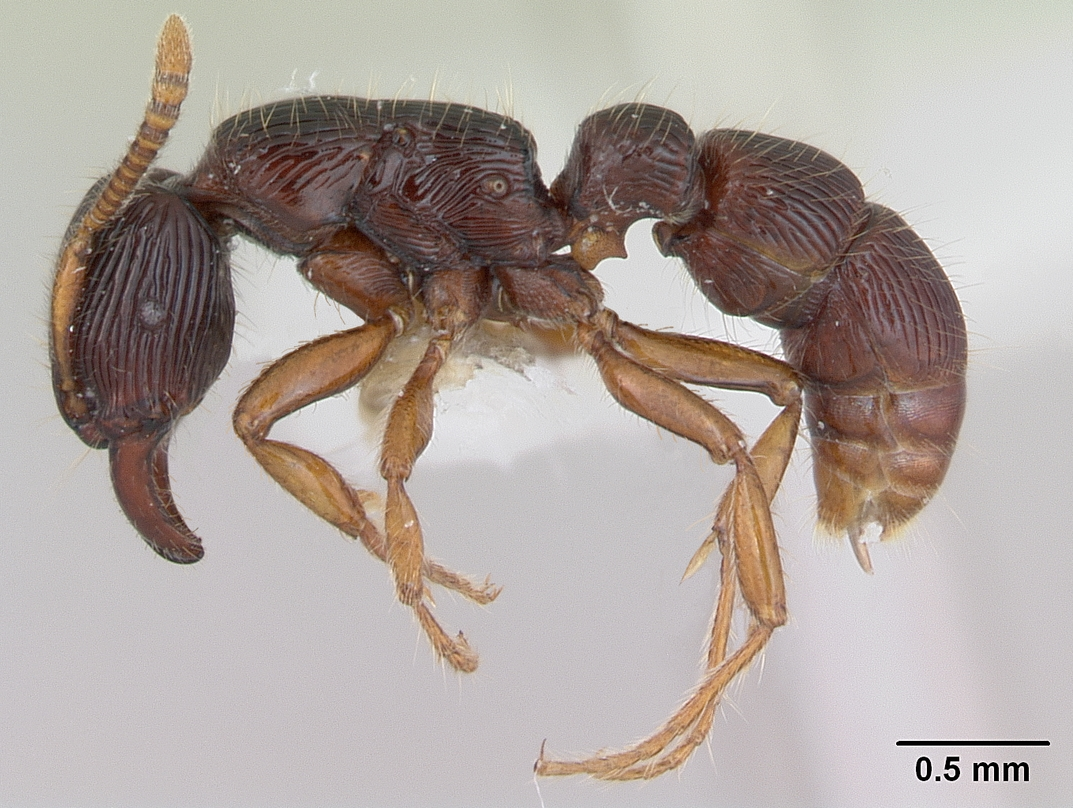
Gnamptogenys continua

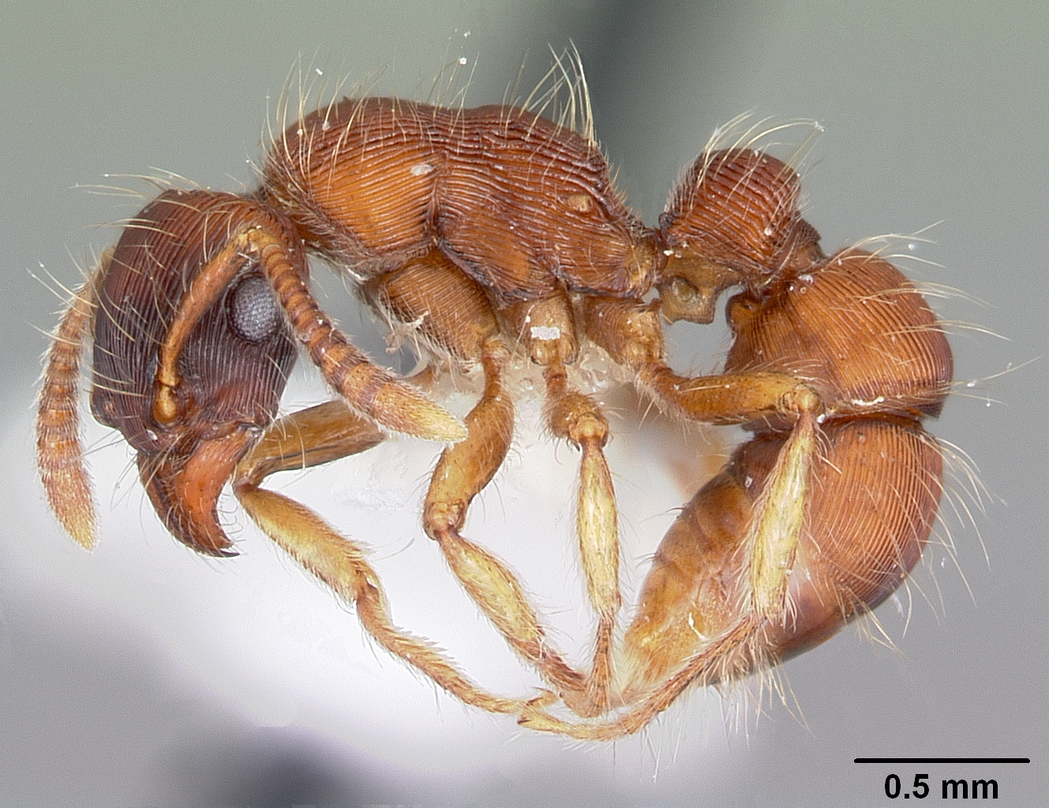
Gnamptogenys hartmani

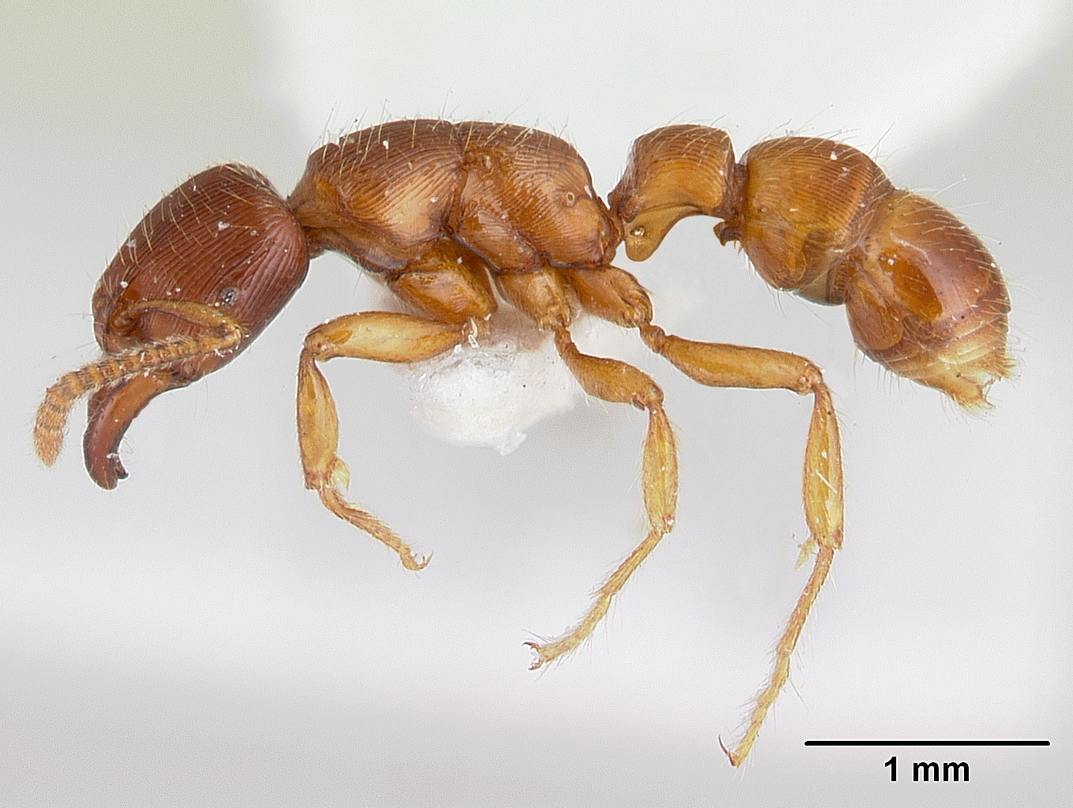
Gnamptogenys interrupta

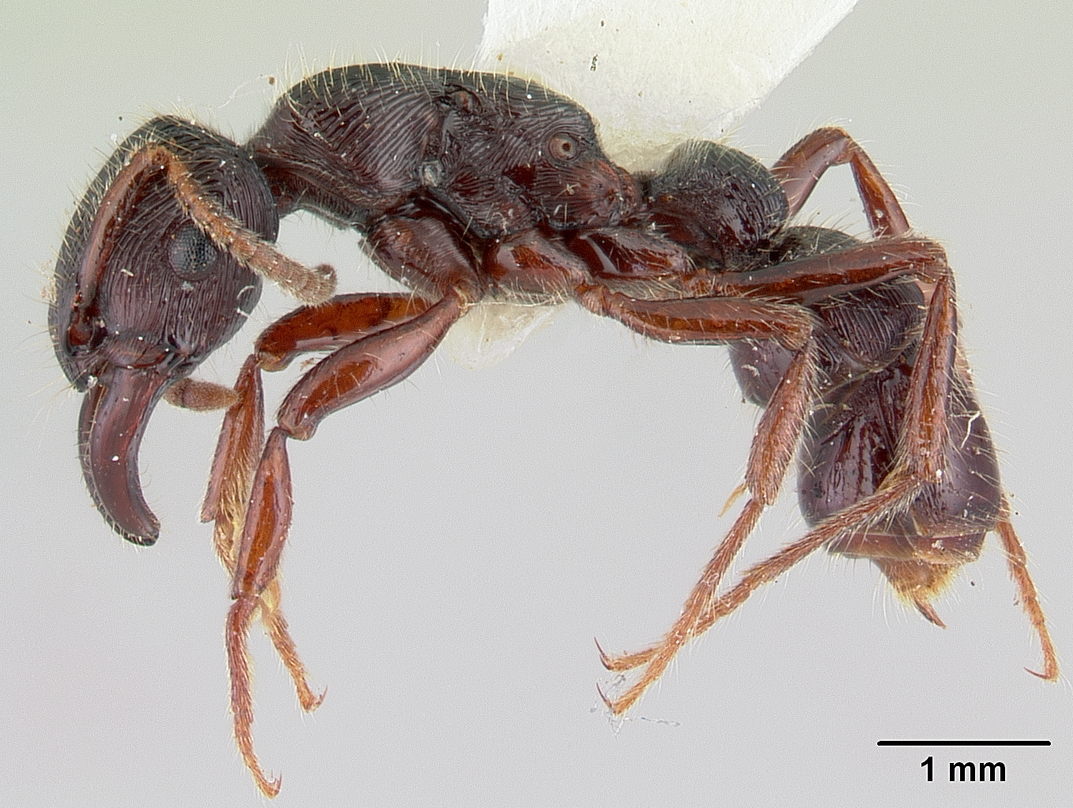
Gnamptogenys mordax

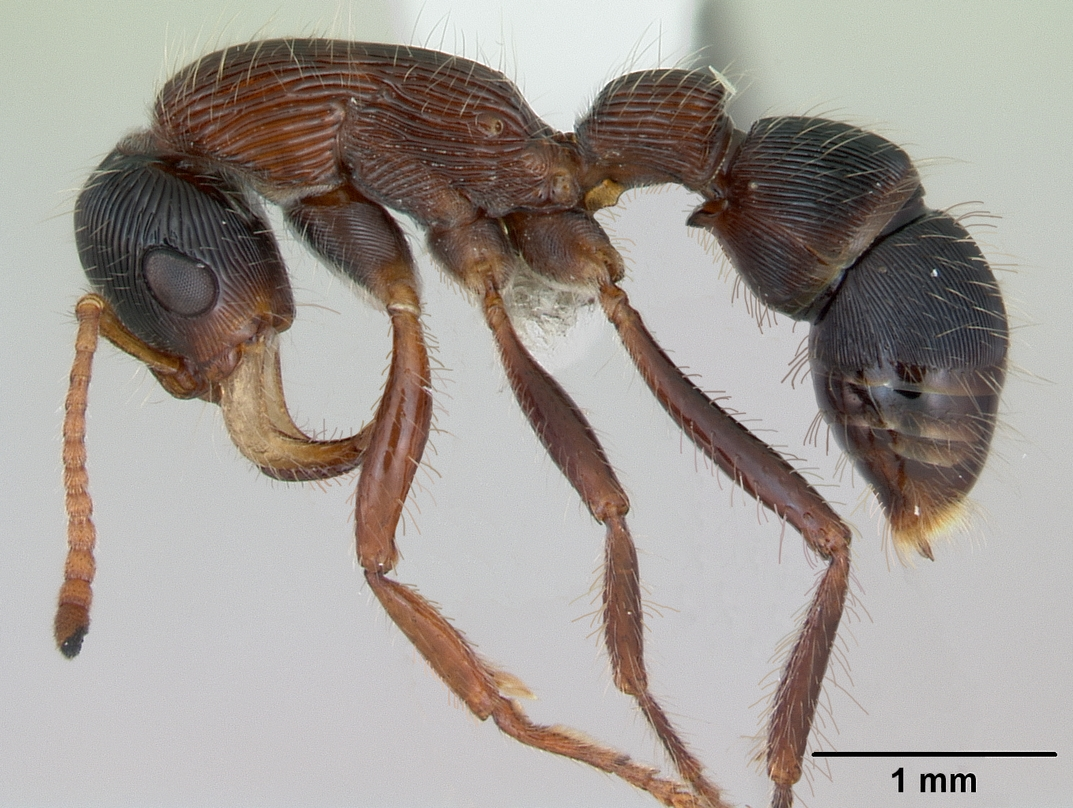
Gnamptogenys sulcata

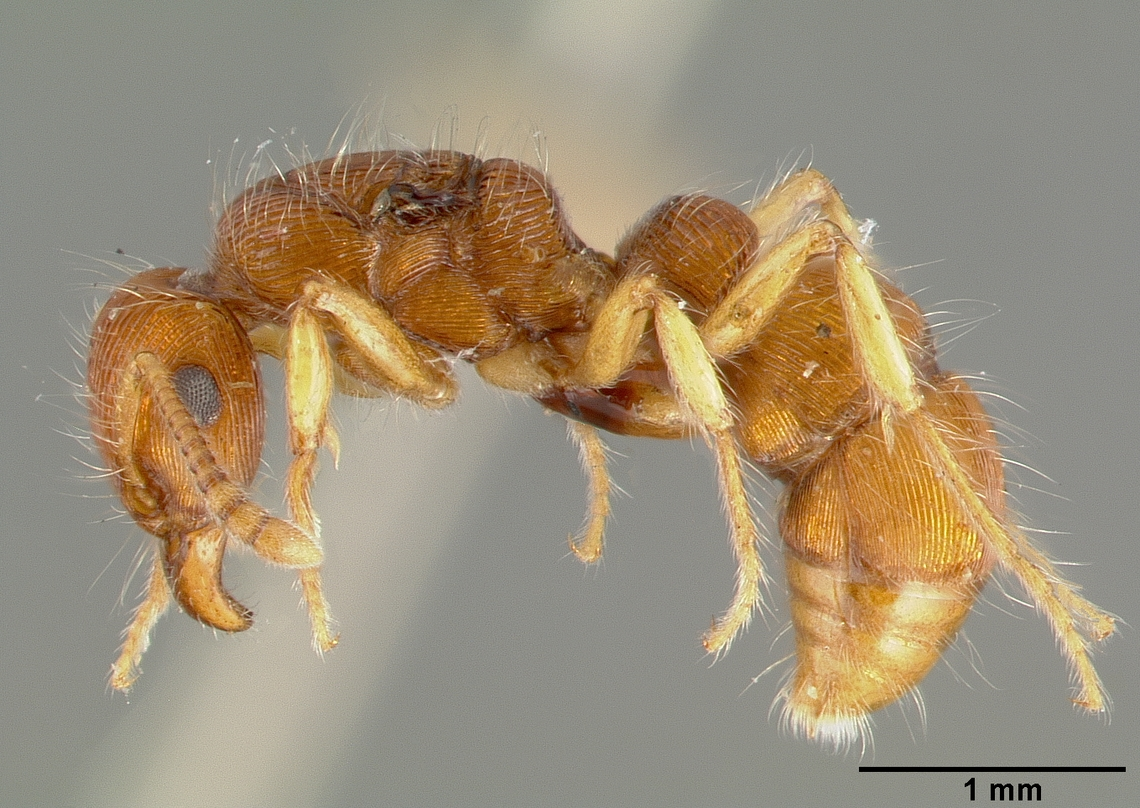
Gnamptogenys regularis

- Gnamptogenys acuminata
- Gnamptogenys alfaroi
- Gnamptogenys andersoni
- Gnamptogenys annulata
- Gnamptogenys biquetra
- Gnamptogenys boliviensis
- Gnamptogenys bruchi
- †Gnamptogenys casca
- Gnamptogenys concinna
- Gnamptogenys continua
- Gnamptogenys curvoclypeata
- Gnamptogenys ericae
- †Gnamptogenys europaea
- Gnamptogenys falcaria
- Gnamptogenys fernandezi
- Gnamptogenys flava
- Gnamptogenys haenschi
- Gnamptogenys hartmani
- Gnamptogenys horni
- Gnamptogenys interrupta
- Gnamptogenys kempfi
- †Gnamptogenys levinates
- Gnamptogenys mordax
- Gnamptogenys nana
- †Gnamptogenys pristina
- Gnamptogenys regularis
- Gnamptogenys rimulosa
- †Gnamptogenys rohdendorfi
- Gnamptogenys rugimala
- Gnamptogenys rumba
- Gnamptogenys schmitti
- Gnamptogenys siapensis
- Gnamptogenys stellae
- Gnamptogenys sulcata
- Gnamptogenys tortuolosa
- Gnamptogenys transversa
- Gnamptogenys volcano
