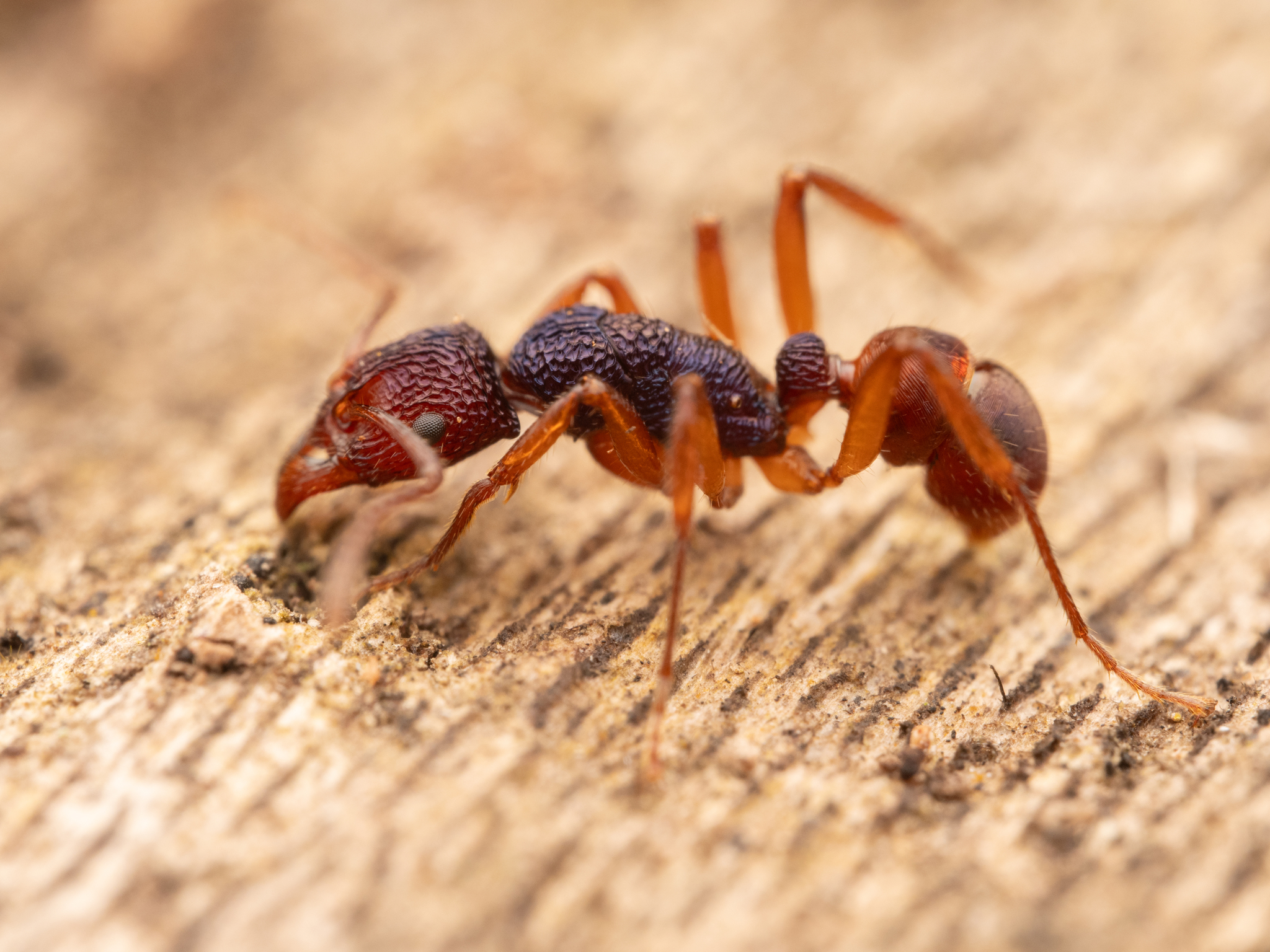
- Rhytidoponera croesus worker

Scientific classification
- Domain: Eukaryota
- Kingdom: Animalia
- Phylum: Arthropoda
- Class: Insecta
- Order: Hymenoptera
- Family: Formicidae
- Subfamily: Ectatomminae
- Tribe: Ectatommini
- Genus: Rhytidoponera; Mayr, 1862

Type species
- Ponera araneoides

Diversity
- 106 species

Synonyms
- Chalcoponera Emery, 1897

= Rhytidoponera =

Genus of ants

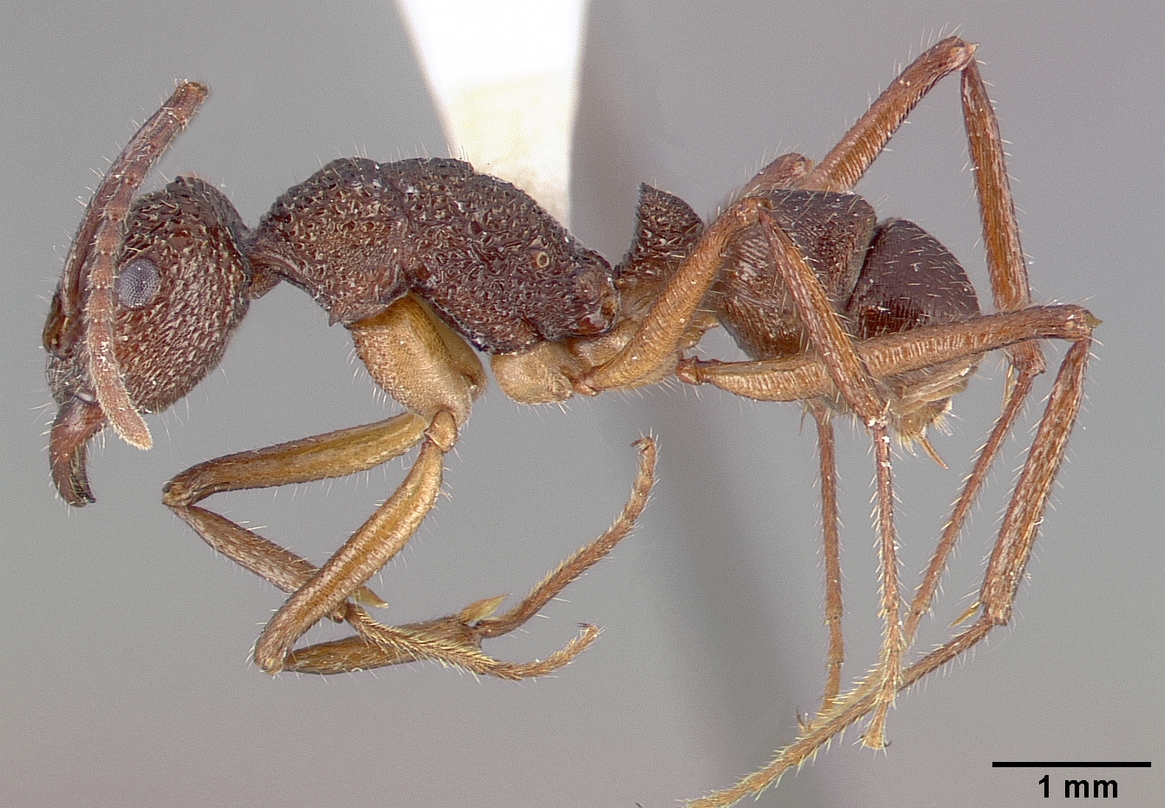
Rhytidoponera celtinodis

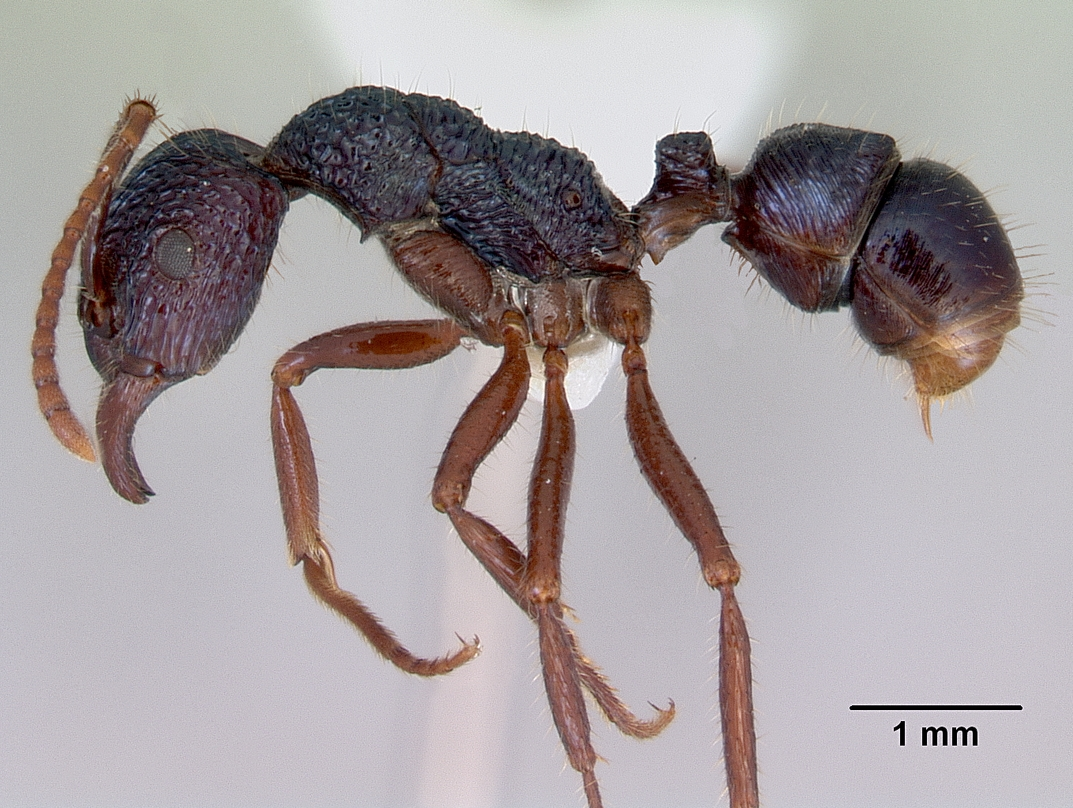
Rhytidoponera chalybaea

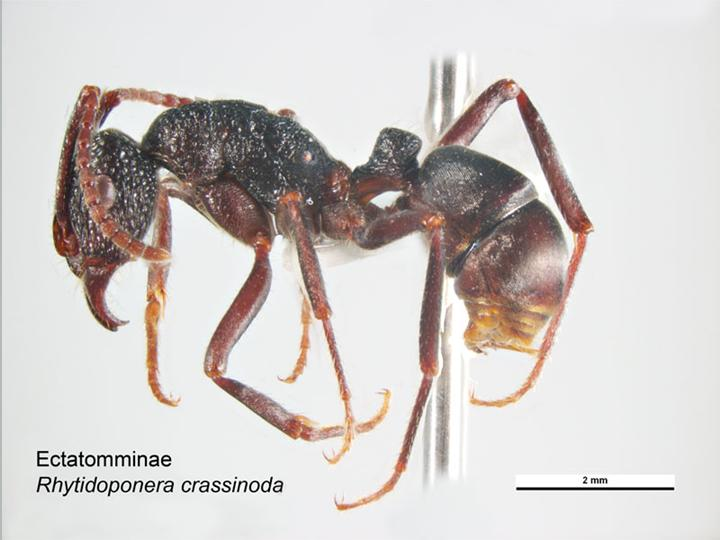
Rhytidoponera crassinoda

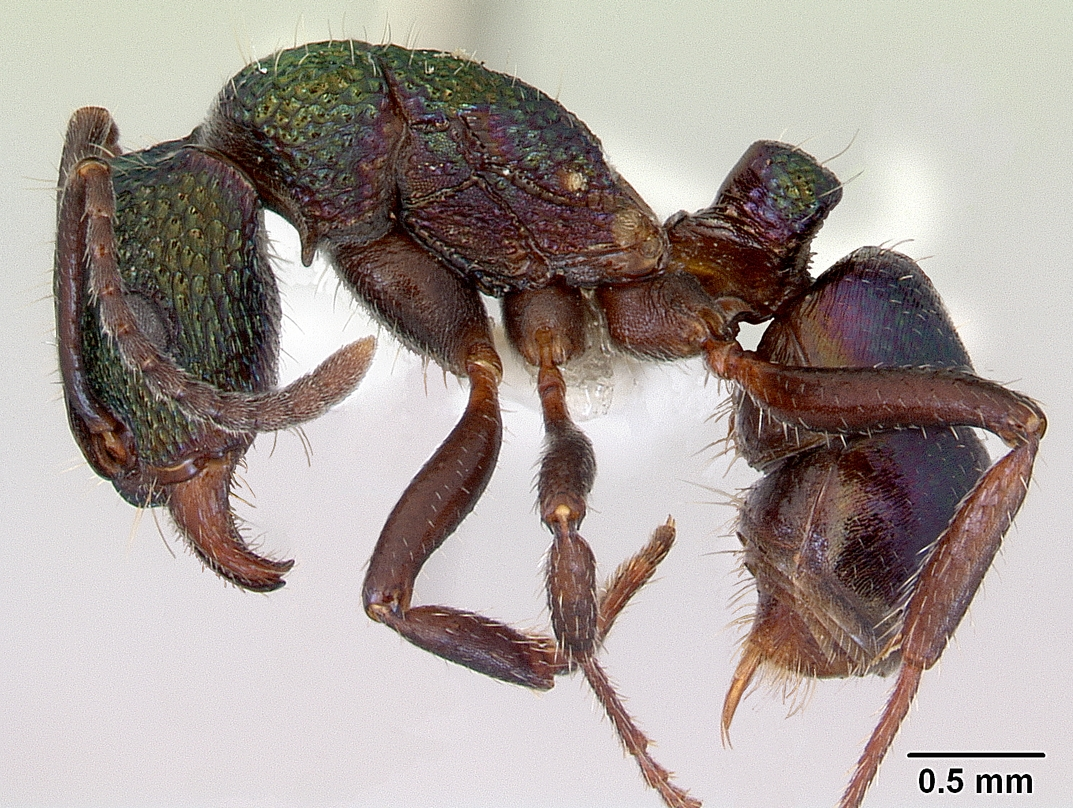
Rhytidoponera metallica

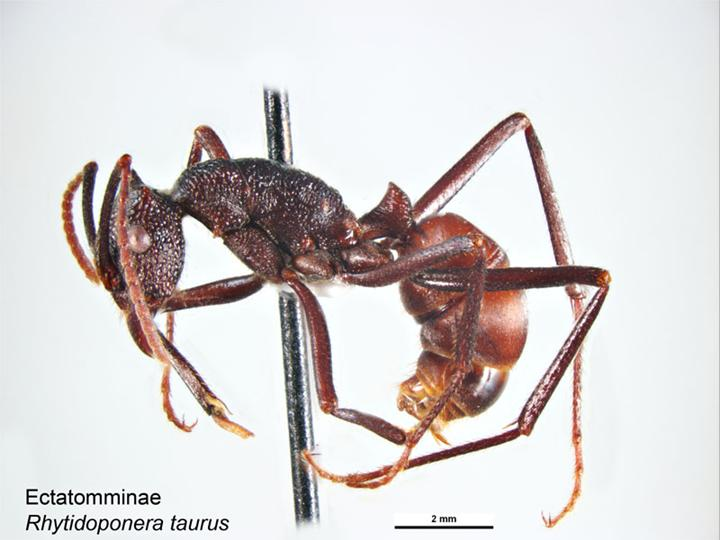
Rhytidoponera taurus

Rhytidoponera is a large genus of ants in the subfamily Ectatomminae. The genus is known from Australia and Melanesia, with New Caledonia as the most eastern limit.

Some Rhytidoponera species have both winged alate queens and gamergates. All known queenless species of Rhytidoponera are polygynous.

== Species ==
- Rhytidoponera abdominalis Viehmeyer, 1912
- Rhytidoponera acanthoponeroides Viehmeyer, 1924
- Rhytidoponera aciculata (Smith, 1858)
- Rhytidoponera aenescens Emery, 1900
- Rhytidoponera anceps Emery, 1898
- Rhytidoponera aquila Ward, 1984
- Rhytidoponera araneoides (Le Guillou, 1842)
- Rhytidoponera arborea Ward, 1984
- Rhytidoponera aspera (Roger, 1860)
- Rhytidoponera atropurpurea Emery, 1914
- Rhytidoponera aurata (Roger, 1861)
- Rhytidoponera barnardi Clark, 1936
- Rhytidoponera barretti Clark, 1941
- Rhytidoponera borealis Crawley, 1918
- Rhytidoponera carinata Clark, 1936
- Rhytidoponera celtinodis Wilson, 1958
- Rhytidoponera cerastes Crawley, 1925
- Rhytidoponera chalybaea Emery, 1901
- Rhytidoponera chnoopyx Brown, 1958
- Rhytidoponera clarki Donisthorpe, 1943
- Rhytidoponera confusa Ward, 1980
- Rhytidoponera convexa (Mayr, 1876)
- Rhytidoponera cornuta (Emery, 1895)
- Rhytidoponera crassinoda (Forel, 1907)
- Rhytidoponera cristata (Mayr, 1876)
- Rhytidoponera croesus Emery, 1901
- Rhytidoponera depilis Ward, 1984
- Rhytidoponera dubia Crawley, 1915
- Rhytidoponera enigmatica Ward, 1980
- Rhytidoponera eremita Clark, 1936
- Rhytidoponera ferruginea Clark, 1936
- Rhytidoponera flavicornis Clark, 1936
- Rhytidoponera flavipes (Clark, 1941)
- Rhytidoponera flindersi Clark, 1936
- Rhytidoponera foreli Crawley, 1918
- Rhytidoponera foveolata Crawley, 1925
- Rhytidoponera fulgens (Emery, 1883)
- Rhytidoponera fuliginosa Clark, 1936
- Rhytidoponera greavesi Clark, 1941
- Rhytidoponera gregoryi Clark, 1936
- Rhytidoponera haeckeli (Forel, 1910)
- Rhytidoponera hanieli Forel, 1913
- Rhytidoponera hilli Crawley, 1915
- Rhytidoponera impressa (Mayr, 1876)
- Rhytidoponera incisa Crawley, 1915
- Rhytidoponera inops Emery, 1900
- Rhytidoponera inornata Crawley, 1922
- Rhytidoponera insularis Ward, 1984
- †Rhytidoponera kirghizorum Dlussky, 1981
- Rhytidoponera koumensis Ward, 1984
- Rhytidoponera kurandensis Brown, 1958
- Rhytidoponera laciniosa Viehmeyer, 1912
- Rhytidoponera lamellinodis Santschi, 1919
- Rhytidoponera laticeps Forel, 1915
- Rhytidoponera levior Crawley, 1925
- Rhytidoponera litoralis Ward, 1984
- Rhytidoponera luteipes Ward, 1984
- Rhytidoponera maledicta Forel, 1915
- Rhytidoponera maniae (Forel, 1900)
- Rhytidoponera mayri (Emery, 1883)
- Rhytidoponera metallica (Smith, 1858)
- Rhytidoponera micans Clark, 1936
- Rhytidoponera mimica Ward, 1984
- Rhytidoponera mirabilis Clark, 1936
- Rhytidoponera nexa Stitz, 1912
- Rhytidoponera nitida Clark, 1936
- Rhytidoponera nitidiventris Ward, 1984
- Rhytidoponera nodifera (Emery, 1895)
- Rhytidoponera nudata (Mayr, 1876)
- Rhytidoponera numeensis (André, 1889)
- Rhytidoponera opaciventris Ward, 1984
- Rhytidoponera peninsularis Brown, 1958
- Rhytidoponera petiolata Clark, 1936
- Rhytidoponera pilosula Clark, 1936
- Rhytidoponera pulchella (Emery, 1883)
- Rhytidoponera punctata (Smith, 1858)
- Rhytidoponera punctigera Crawley, 1925
- Rhytidoponera punctiventris (Forel, 1900)
- Rhytidoponera purpurea (Emery, 1887)
- Rhytidoponera reflexa Clark, 1936
- Rhytidoponera reticulata (Forel, 1893)
- Rhytidoponera rotundiceps Viehmeyer, 1914
- Rhytidoponera rufescens (Forel, 1900)
- Rhytidoponera rufithorax Clark, 1941
- Rhytidoponera rufiventris Forel, 1915
- Rhytidoponera rufonigra Clark, 1936
- Rhytidoponera scaberrima (Emery, 1895)
- Rhytidoponera scabra (Mayr, 1876)
- Rhytidoponera scabrior Crawley, 1925
- Rhytidoponera socra (Forel, 1894)
- Rhytidoponera spoliata (Emery, 1895)
- Rhytidoponera strigosa (Emery, 1887)
- Rhytidoponera subcyanea Emery, 1897
- Rhytidoponera tasmaniensis Emery, 1898
- Rhytidoponera taurus (Forel, 1910)
- Rhytidoponera tenuis (Forel, 1900)
- Rhytidoponera terrestris Ward, 1984
- Rhytidoponera trachypyx Brown, 1958
- Rhytidoponera turneri (Forel, 1910)
- Rhytidoponera tyloxys Brown, 1958
- Rhytidoponera versicolor Brown, 1958
- Rhytidoponera victoriae (André, 1896)
- Rhytidoponera violacea (Forel, 1907)
- Rhytidoponera viridis (Clark, 1941)
- Rhytidoponera wilsoni Brown, 1958
- Rhytidoponera yorkensis Forel, 1915
