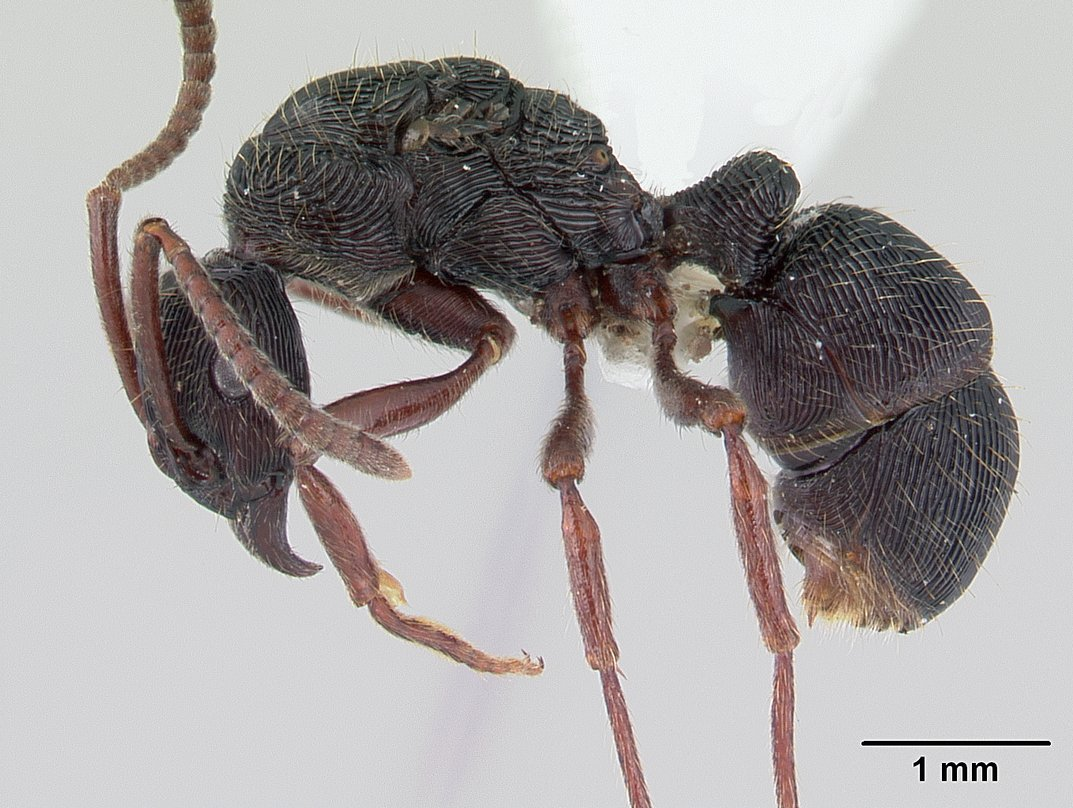
- Holcoponera striatula

Scientific classification
- Kingdom: Animalia
- Phylum: Arthropoda
- Class: Insecta
- Order: Hymenoptera
- Family: Formicidae
- Subfamily: Ectatomminae
- Tribe: Ectatommini
- Genus: Holcoponera; Mayr, 1887

Type species
- Gnamptogenys striatula (Mayr, 1884)

Diversity
- 40 species

= Holcoponera =

Genus of ants

Holcoponera is a genus of ants in the subfamily Ectatomminae. They are found in the Neotropics, Southeast Asia, and Oceania. The genus was synonymized under Gnamptogenys for a long time, however Camacho et al. 2022 reinstated the validity of this genus.

== Species ==
As of 2024, Holcoponera contains 40 valid extant species.

- Holcoponera acuta
- Holcoponera albiclava
- Holcoponera ammophila
- Holcoponera andina
- Holcoponera aspera
- Holcoponera aterrima
- Holcoponera atrata
- Holcoponera auricula
- Holcoponera avus
- Holcoponera bisulca
- Holcoponera brunnea
- Holcoponera crenaticeps
- Holcoponera cribrata
- Holcoponera dichotoma
- Holcoponera ejuncida
- Holcoponera epinotalis
- Holcoponera extra
- Holcoponera gentryi
- Holcoponera gracilis
- Holcoponera haytiana
- Holcoponera ilimani
- Holcoponera latistriata
- Holcoponera lucida
- Holcoponera luzonensis
- Holcoponera major
- Holcoponera malaensis
- Holcoponera mina
- Holcoponera moelleri
- Holcoponera nigrivitrea
- Holcoponera pernambucana
- Holcoponera pilosa
- Holcoponera pittieri
- Holcoponera pleurodon
- Holcoponera porcata
- Holcoponera preciosa
- Holcoponera relicta
- Holcoponera sila
- Holcoponera solomonensis
- Holcoponera striatula
- Holcoponera strigata
