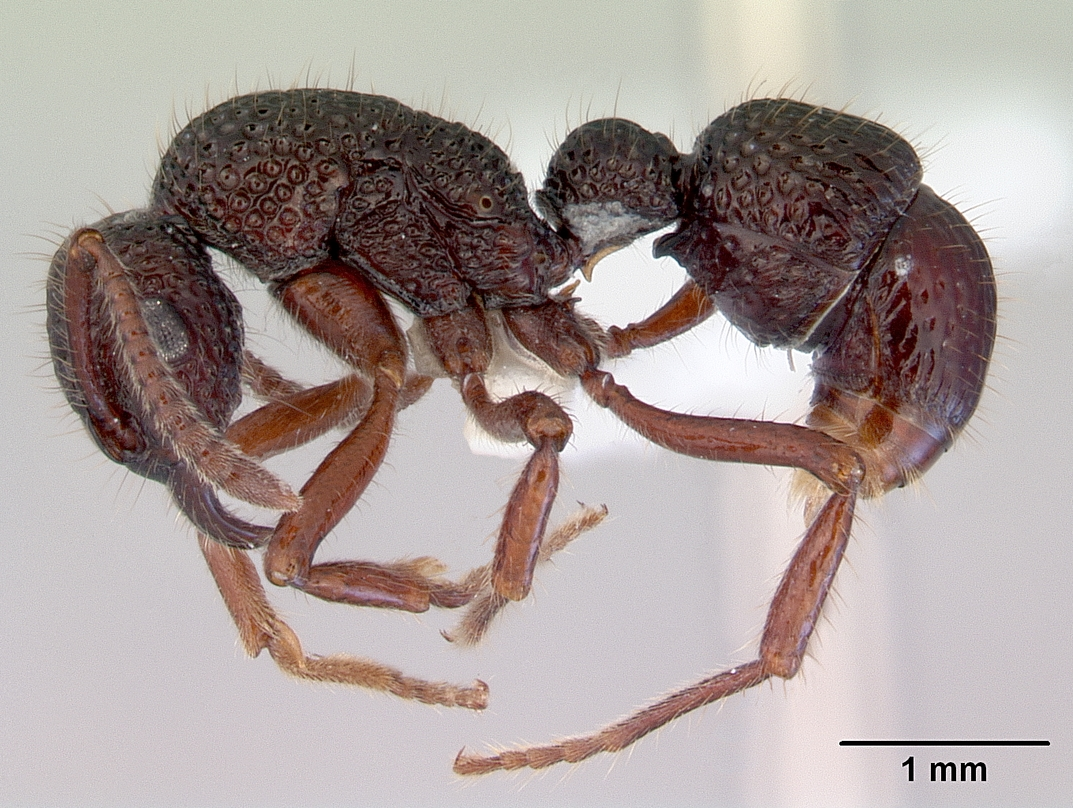
- Stictoponera biroi

Scientific classification
- Kingdom: Animalia
- Phylum: Arthropoda
- Class: Insecta
- Order: Hymenoptera
- Family: Formicidae
- Subfamily: Ectatomminae
- Tribe: Ectatommini
- Genus: Stictoponera; Mayr, 1887

Type species
- Ponera coxalis (Roger, 1860)

Diversity
- 43 species

= Stictoponera =

Genus of ants

Stictoponera is a genus of ants in the subfamily Ectatomminae. They are found in Southeast Asia and Oceania. The genus was synonymized under Gnamptogenys for a long time, however Camacho et al. 2022 reinstated the validity of this genus.

== Species ==
As of 2024, Stictoponera contains 43 valid species, all of which are extant.

- Stictoponera bicolor
- Stictoponera biloba
- Stictoponera binghamii
- Stictoponera biroi
- Stictoponera bulbopila
- Stictoponera chapmani
- Stictoponera coccina
- Stictoponera coxalis
- Stictoponera crassicornis
- Stictoponera delta
- Stictoponera dentihumera
- Stictoponera fistulosa
- Stictoponera fontana
- Stictoponera gabata
- Stictoponera gastrodeia
- Stictoponera grammodes
- Stictoponera helisa
- Stictoponera hyalina
- Stictoponera lacunosa
- Stictoponera laevior
- Stictoponera lattkei
- Stictoponera leiolabia
- Stictoponera macretes
- Stictoponera meghalaya
- Stictoponera menadensis
- Stictoponera nanlingensis
- Stictoponera niuguinensis
- Stictoponera ortostoma
- Stictoponera palamala
- Stictoponera panda
- Stictoponera paso
- Stictoponera pertusa
- Stictoponera polytreta
- Stictoponera posteropsis
- Stictoponera quadrutinodules
- Stictoponera rugodens
- Stictoponera scalpta
- Stictoponera sichuanensis
- Stictoponera sinensis
- Stictoponera sinhala
- Stictoponera taivanensis
- Stictoponera toronates
- Stictoponera treta
