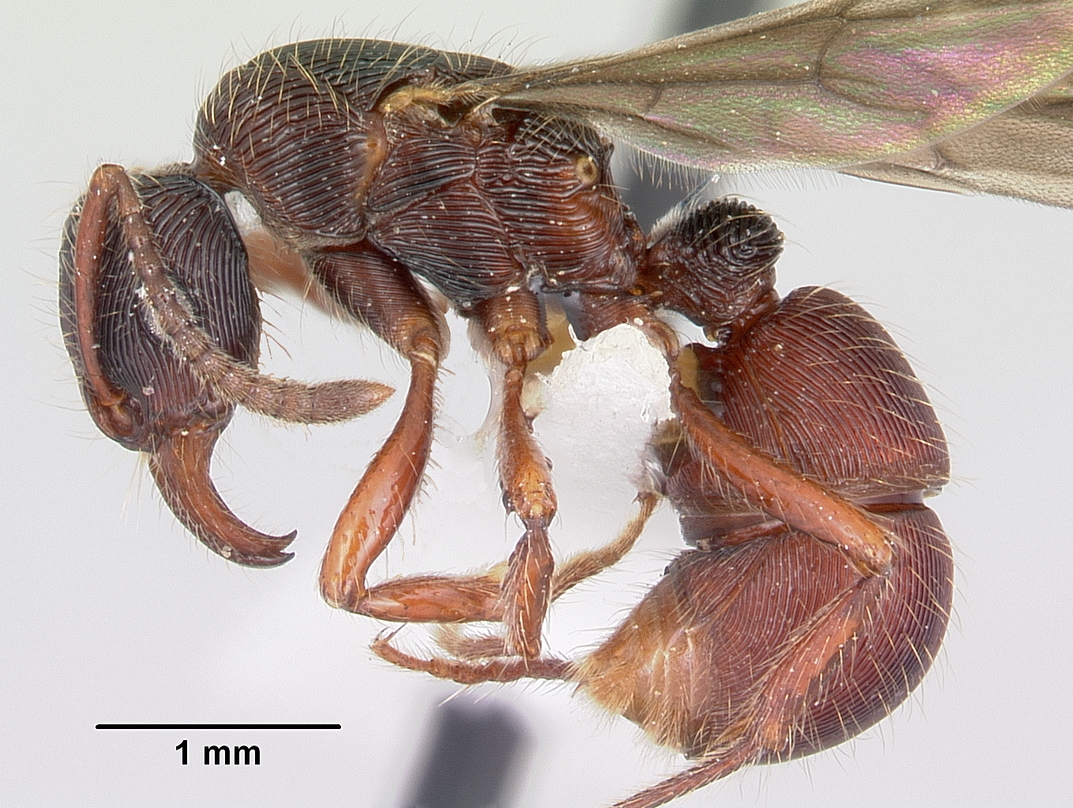
- Poneracantha bispinosa

Scientific classification
- Domain: Eukaryota
- Kingdom: Animalia
- Phylum: Arthropoda
- Class: Insecta
- Order: Hymenoptera
- Family: Formicidae
- Subfamily: Ectatomminae
- Tribe: Ectatommini
- Genus: Poneracantha; Mayr, 1897

Type species
- Ectatomma bispinosum (Emery, 1890)

Diversity
- 18 species

= Poneracantha =

Genus of ants

Poneracantha is a genus of ants in the subfamily Ectatomminae. They are found in Central America, the Caribbean, and Central America. One species, Poneracantha triangularis, is invasive to the southeastern United States. The genus was synonymized under Gnamptogenys for a long time, however Camacho et al. 2022 reinstated the validity of this genus.

== Species ==
As of 2024, Poneracantha contains 19 valid species, of which one, Poneracantha brunoi, is extinct.

- Poneracantha banksi
- Poneracantha bispinosa
- †Poneracantha brunoi
- Poneracantha cuneiforma
- Poneracantha enodis
- Poneracantha ingeborgae
- Poneracantha insularis
- Poneracantha lanei
- Poneracantha laticephala
- Poneracantha lineolata
- Poneracantha lucaris
- Poneracantha mecotyle
- Poneracantha mediatrix
- Poneracantha menozzii
- Poneracantha perspicax
- Poneracantha rastrata
- Poneracantha semiferox
- Poneracantha triangularis
- Poneracantha wilsoni
