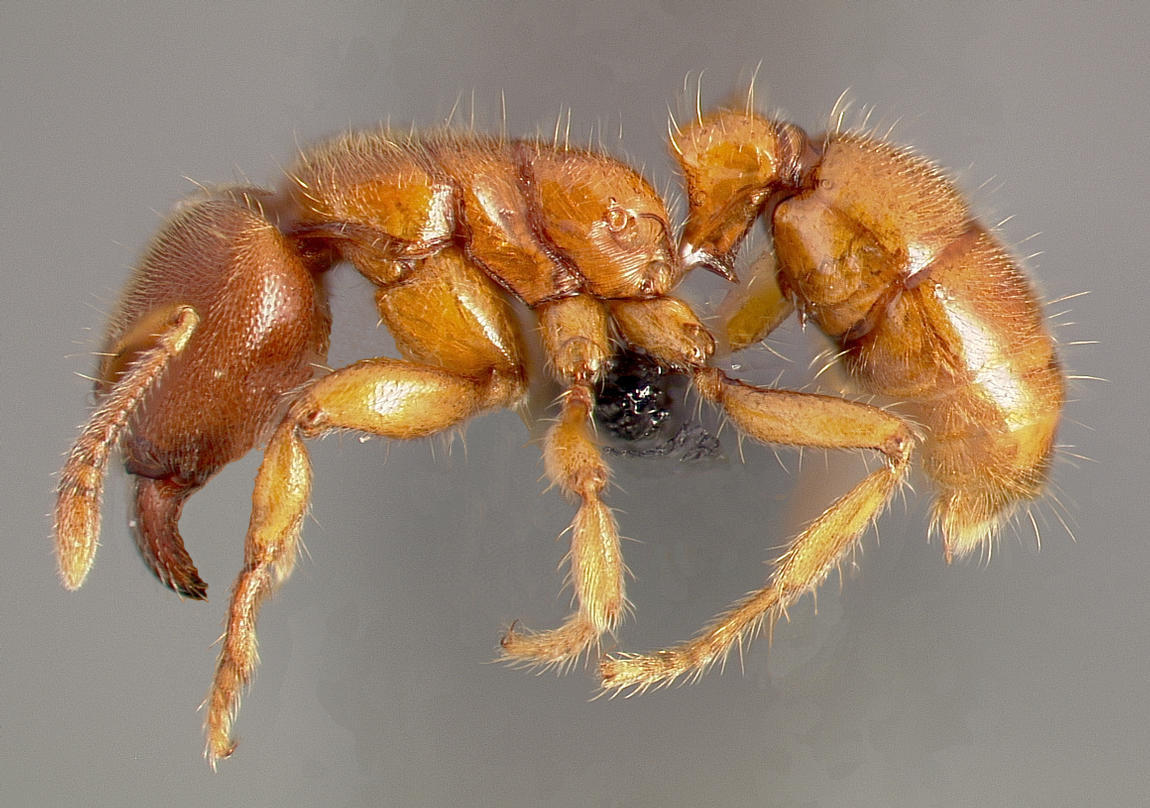
- Typhlomyrmex rogenhoferi worker

Scientific classification
- Domain: Eukaryota
- Kingdom: Animalia
- Phylum: Arthropoda
- Class: Insecta
- Order: Hymenoptera
- Family: Formicidae
- Subfamily: Ectatomminae
- Tribe: Ectatommini
- Genus: Typhlomyrmex; Mayr, 1862

Type species
- Typhlomyrmex rogenhoferi

Diversity
- 11 species

= Typhlomyrmex =

Genus of ants

Typhlomyrmex is a genus of ants in the subfamily Ectatomminae. Known from the Neotropics, the genus has a wide distribution. Some species are restricted in range, while for example Typhlomyrmex rogenhoferi is known from southern Mexico to northern Argentina. Little is known about their biology. The name "Typhlomyrmex" means "blind ant", as this genus contains only blind ants. Previously classified under the monotypic tribe Typhlomyrmecini, it was merged into Ectatommini in 2022.

== Species ==
- Typhlomyrmex clavicornis Emery, 1906
- Typhlomyrmex foreli Santschi, 1925
- Typhlomyrmex major Santschi, 1923
- Typhlomyrmex meire Lacau, Villemant & Delabie, 2004
- Typhlomyrmex prolatus Brown, 1965
- Typhlomyrmex pusillus Emery, 1894
- Typhlomyrmex rogenhoferi Mayr, 1862
