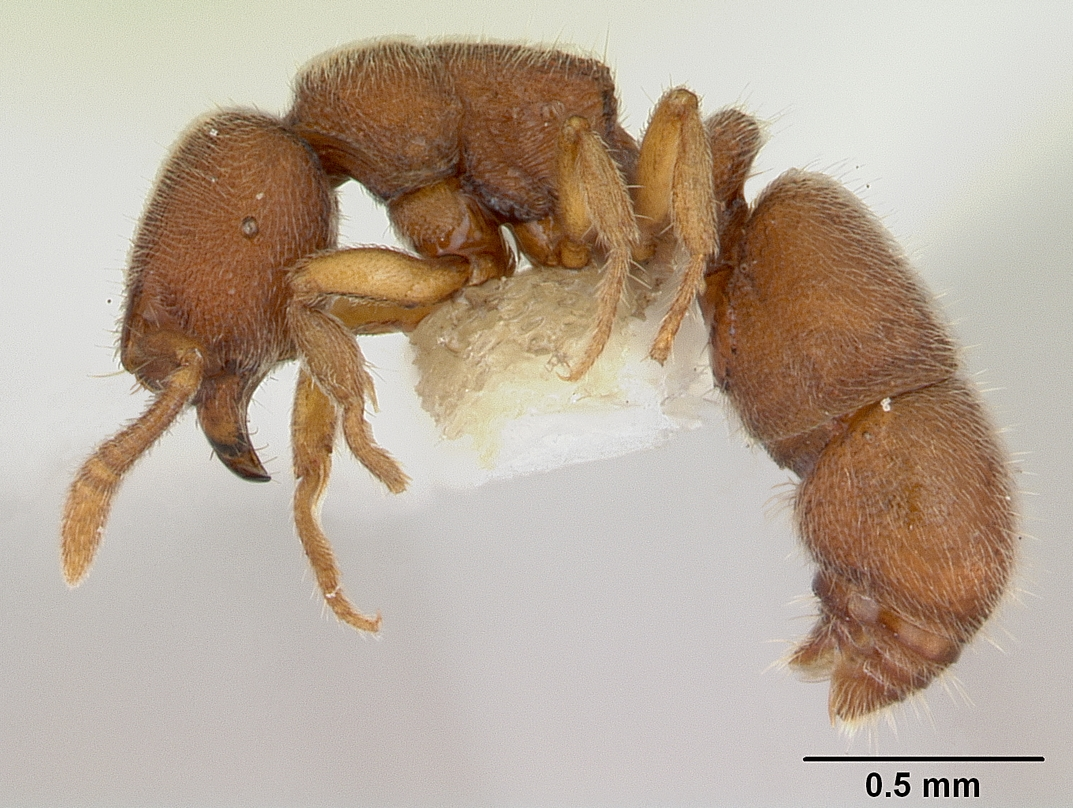

Scientific classification
- Domain: Eukaryota
- Kingdom: Animalia
- Phylum: Arthropoda
- Class: Insecta
- Order: Hymenoptera
- Family: Formicidae
- Subfamily: Ectatomminae
- Tribe: Heteroponerini
- Genus: Bazboltonia
- Species: B. microps

Binomial name
- Bazboltonia microps Borgmeier, 1957

= Bazboltonia =

Species of ant

Bazboltonia microps is a monotypic genus of ants containing the single species Bazboltonia microps. Endemic to South America, it was described by Borgmeier in 1957 as Heteroponera microps.
