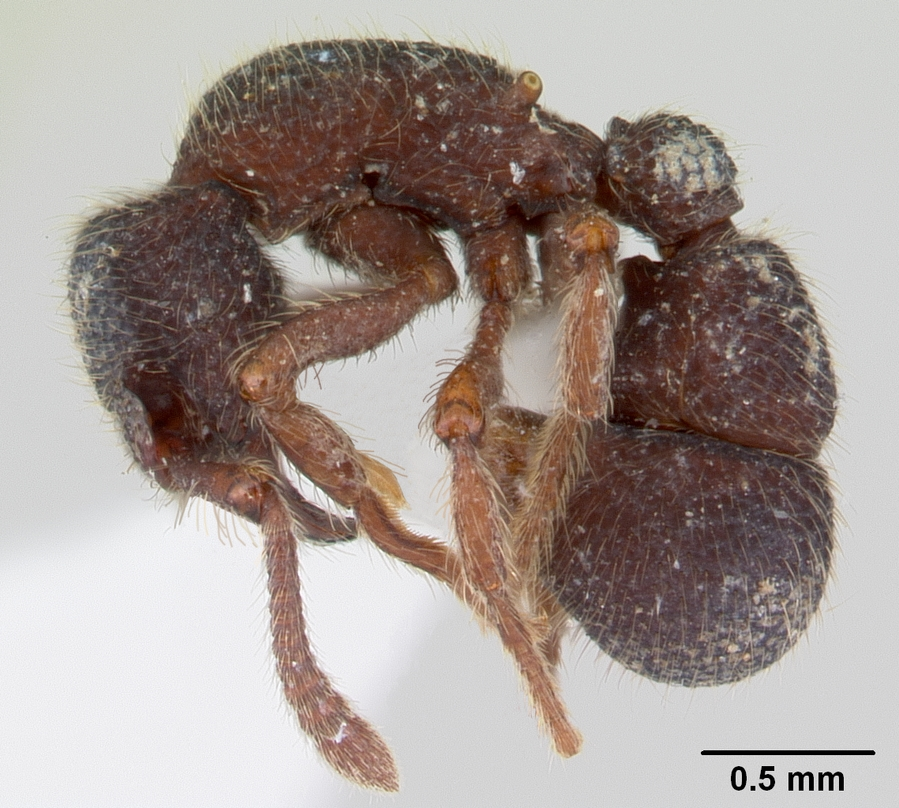
- Alfaria minuta

Scientific classification
- Kingdom: Animalia
- Phylum: Arthropoda
- Class: Insecta
- Order: Hymenoptera
- Family: Formicidae
- Subfamily: Ectatomminae
- Tribe: Ectatommini
- Genus: Alfaria; Emery, 1896

Type species
- Alfaria simulans Emery, 1896

Diversity
- 9 species

= Alfaria (ant) =

Genus of ants

Alfaria is a genus of ants in the subfamily Ectatomminae. They are found in Mexico, Central America, and South America. The genus was synonymized under Gnamptogenys for a long time, however Camacho et al. 2022 reinstated the validity of this genus.

== Species ==
As of 2024, Alfaria contains 9 valid species, all of which are extant.

- Alfaria caelata (Kempf, 1967)
- Alfaria falcifera (Kempf, 1967)
- Alfaria fieldi (Lattke, 1990)
- Alfaria minuta Emery, 1896
- Alfaria petiscapa (Lattke, 1990)
- Alfaria piei (Dias & Lattke, 2019)
- Alfaria simulans Emery, 1896
- Alfaria striolata Borgmeier, 1957
- Alfaria vriesi (Brandão & Lattke, 1990)
