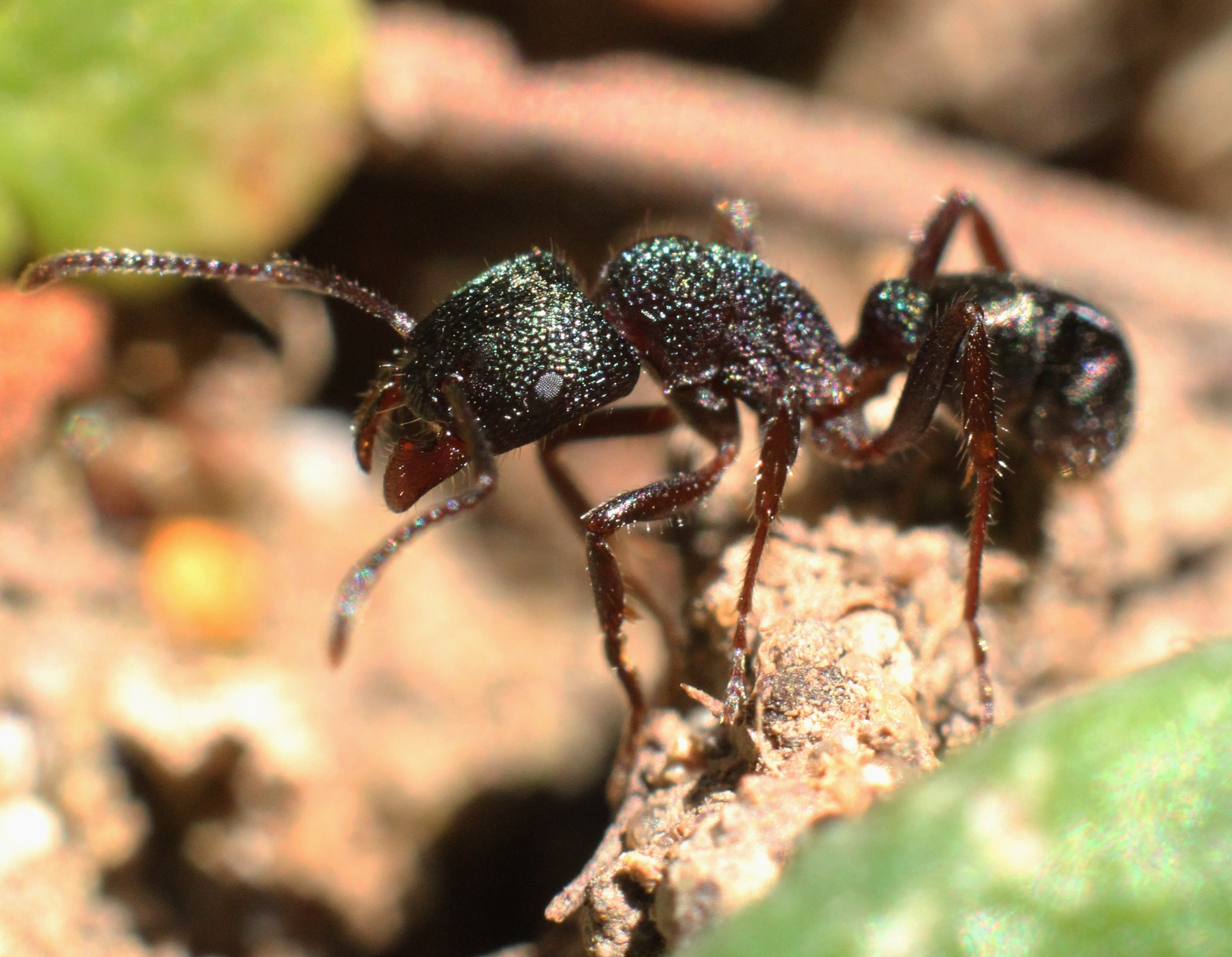
- Green-head ant (Rhytidoponera metallica)

Scientific classification
- Kingdom: Animalia
- Phylum: Arthropoda
- Clade: Pancrustacea
- Class: Insecta
- Order: Hymenoptera
- Family: Formicidae
- Clade: Myrmicomorpha
- Subfamily: Ectatomminae; Emery, 1895

Type genus
- Ectatomma Smith, 1858

Diversity
- 15 genera

= Ectatomminae =

Subfamily of ants

Ectatomminae is a subfamily of ants containing twelve extant and three extinct genera in two tribes. The subfamily was described in 2003 when Barry Bolton divided the Ponerinae subfamily into six subfamilies. Heteroponerinae used to be an independent subfamily, but was merged into Ectatomminae in 2022. The taxonomical position of Ectatomminae was further upheld in a genomic reanalysis conducted with alternate methods in 2024.

== Taxonomy ==
- Ectatommini Emery, 1896
  - Alfaria Dlussky, 1999
  - †Canapone Dlussky, 1999
  - Ectatomma Smith, 1858
  - †Electroponera Wheeler, 1915
  - Gnamptogenys Roger, 1863
  - Holcoponera Mayr, 1887
  - Poneracantha Emery, 1897
  - †Pseudectatomma Dlussky & Wedman, 2012
  - Rhytidoponera Mayr, 1862
  - Stictoponera Mayr, 1887
  - Typhlomyrmex Mayr, 1862
- Heteroponerini Bolton, 2003
  - Acanthoponera Mayr, 1862
  - Aulacopone Arnol'di, 1930
  - Bazboltonia Camacho & Feitosa, 2022
  - Heteroponera Mayr, 1887
