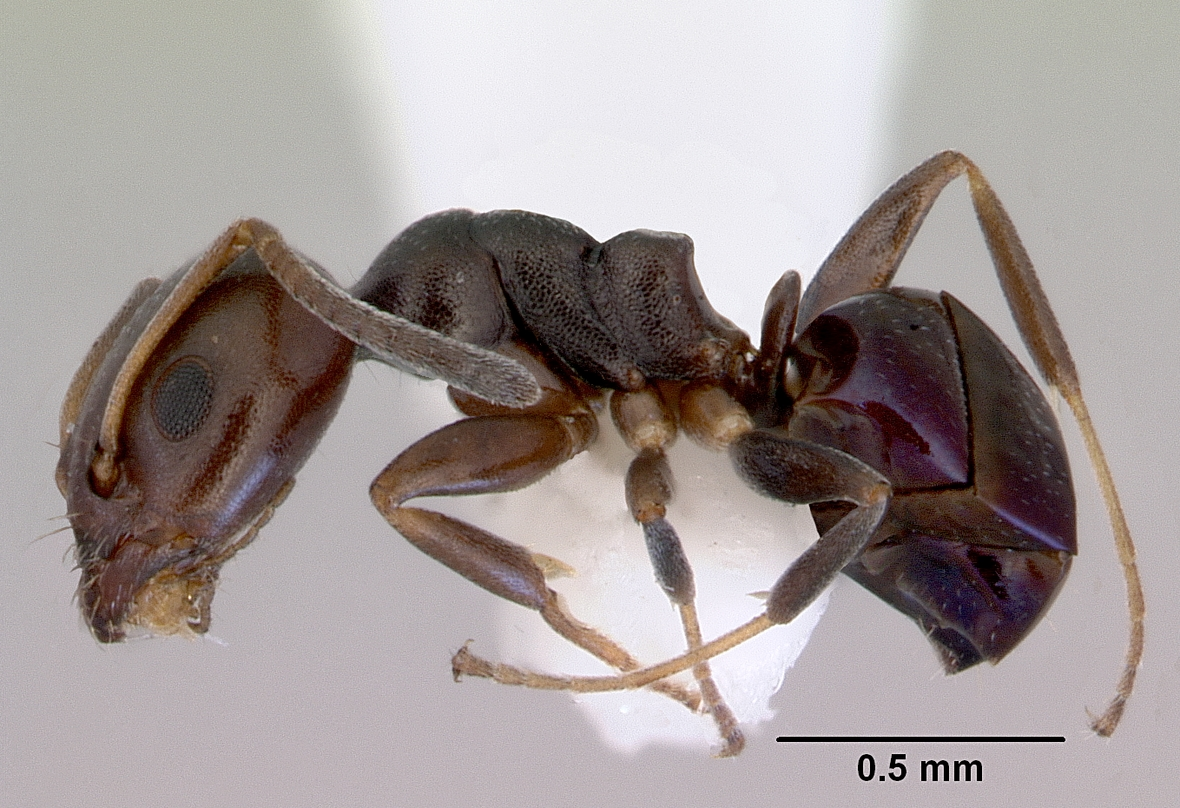
- Ochetellus glaber worker

Scientific classification
- Kingdom: Animalia
- Phylum: Arthropoda
- Clade: Pancrustacea
- Class: Insecta
- Order: Hymenoptera
- Family: Formicidae
- Subfamily: Dolichoderinae
- Tribe: Leptomyrmecini
- Genus: Ochetellus; Shattuck, 1992

Type species
- Hypoclinea glabra Mayr, 1862

Diversity
- 7 species, 3 subspecies

= Ochetellus =

Genus of ants

Ochetellus is a genus of ants first described by Steve Shattuck in 1992. He placed it in the subfamily Dolichoderinae of the family Formicidae. The ants in this genus are small and black in colour; workers measure 1.75 to 3 millimetres (0.07 to 0.12 in) in length, the males at around 1.6 millimetres (0.06 in) are smaller, and the queens are the largest, reaching 4 millimetres (0.16 in). There are seven described species and three described subspecies that mostly live in Australia in a wide variety of habitats, but some species are found in Asia. One species, Ochetellus glaber, has been introduced into New Zealand and the United States.

The colonies are found in rotten wood, in the ground, under rocks or stones and in urban areas. The ants are both diurnal and nocturnal and forage on trees, in low vegetation and into human homes, where they are regarded as pests. These ants eat a variety of foods, including fruits, insects, sucrose, nectar and bird feces. They visit various flowers and attend to a variety of butterfly larvae. The thorny devil, an Australian lizard, predominantly feeds on Ochetellus workers, and other ant species also prey on them.

== Taxonomy ==
The genus Ochetellus was first described by Steve Shattuck in 1992, placing it in the subfamily Dolichoderinae. The type species of the genus is Ochetellus glaber, originally described as Hypoclinea glabra by Austrian entomologist Gustav Mayr in 1862. The genus was originally placed in the tribe Dolichoderini. It was later placed under the tribe Iridomyrmecini, now classified as a synonym for the tribe Leptomyrmecini.

The genus consists of seven species and three subspecies that were previously placed in the genus Iridomyrmex. The genus contains the following species: O. democles, O. epinotalis, O. flavipes, O. glaber, O. punctatissimus, O. sororis and O. vinsoni. The three subspecies classified in this genus are O. glaber clarithorax, O. glaber consimilis and O. glaber sommeri.

== Description ==
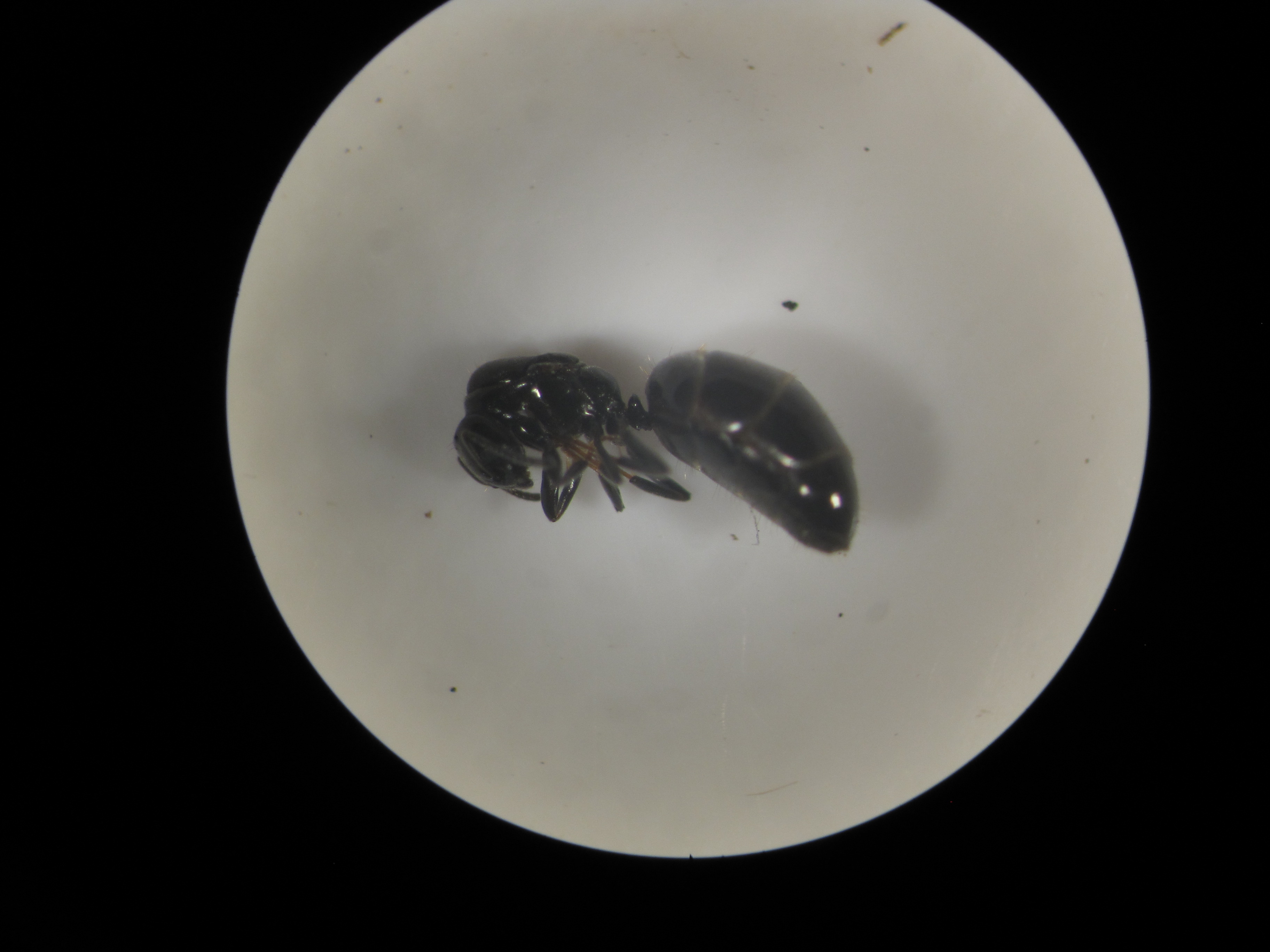
Dead Ochetellus glaber queen

Ochtellus is a genus of small black ants; each species vary in size, with workers ranging from 1.75 to 3 millimetres (0.07 to 0.12 in) in length and males are smaller at 1.6 millimetres (0.06 in). The largest ants in the genus are the queens; Ochetellus sororis queens measure up to 4 millimetres (0.16 in). While these ants were formerly placed in the genus Iridomyrmex, there are several features that makes these ants distinct; the compound eyes are differently positioned on the head, and the arrangement of the clypeal margin and mesosoma can also distinguish between the two genera. Ochetellus looks similar to Dolichoderus species, but they are relatively smaller and the petiole is narrow and dorsolaterally expanded. The head is also thinner than most Dolichoderinae ants.

On the head, the occipital border either curves in or curves out, and no ocelli are present. The antennae consist of twelve segments. The mandibles each have six to eight teeth along with a large apical tooth.

== Distribution and habitat ==
Ochetellus ants are native to Australia and have been introduced into New Zealand. In Asia, they are native to India, Japan, the Philippines and southern Burma. Species are found on the islands of Fiji, Mauritius and New Caledonia. Ochetellus glaber was first sighted in Hawaii in 1977 and is considered an invasive species. Since its introduction, the ant has spread throughout the state, and is now found in Hawaii, Kahoolawe, Kauai, Maui and Oahu. The ant has also been introduced to mainland United States, being found in north-central Florida, where it is localised in Orange County.

Ants of this genus are eurychoric; they have a widespread geographic distribution in many different climates, but they are usually found in dry and mesic habitats. They are referred to as a tropical genus, but the type specimen was collected from temperate Sydney. They are found in sclerophyll woodland and forests, eucalypt woodland, Casuarina forests, mallee, hillsides, beaches and urban areas. These ants are arboreal ants and nests are located in bark, logs, rotten wood, sand, soil, under rocks and stones, tree stumps and twigs or branches. In urban areas, colonies are found under cracked paths, inside house walls or in patio areas. Some species are considered pests, and they forage into pastures and houses where they show a preference for fluids and sweets. Ochetellus flavipes nesting habits are unique among Australian ants, and they construct small runways across the ground. These nests are structurally similar to nests built by some Polyrhachis ants, which construct platforms woven from plants that house the Hemiptera insects they attend to.

== Behaviour and ecology ==
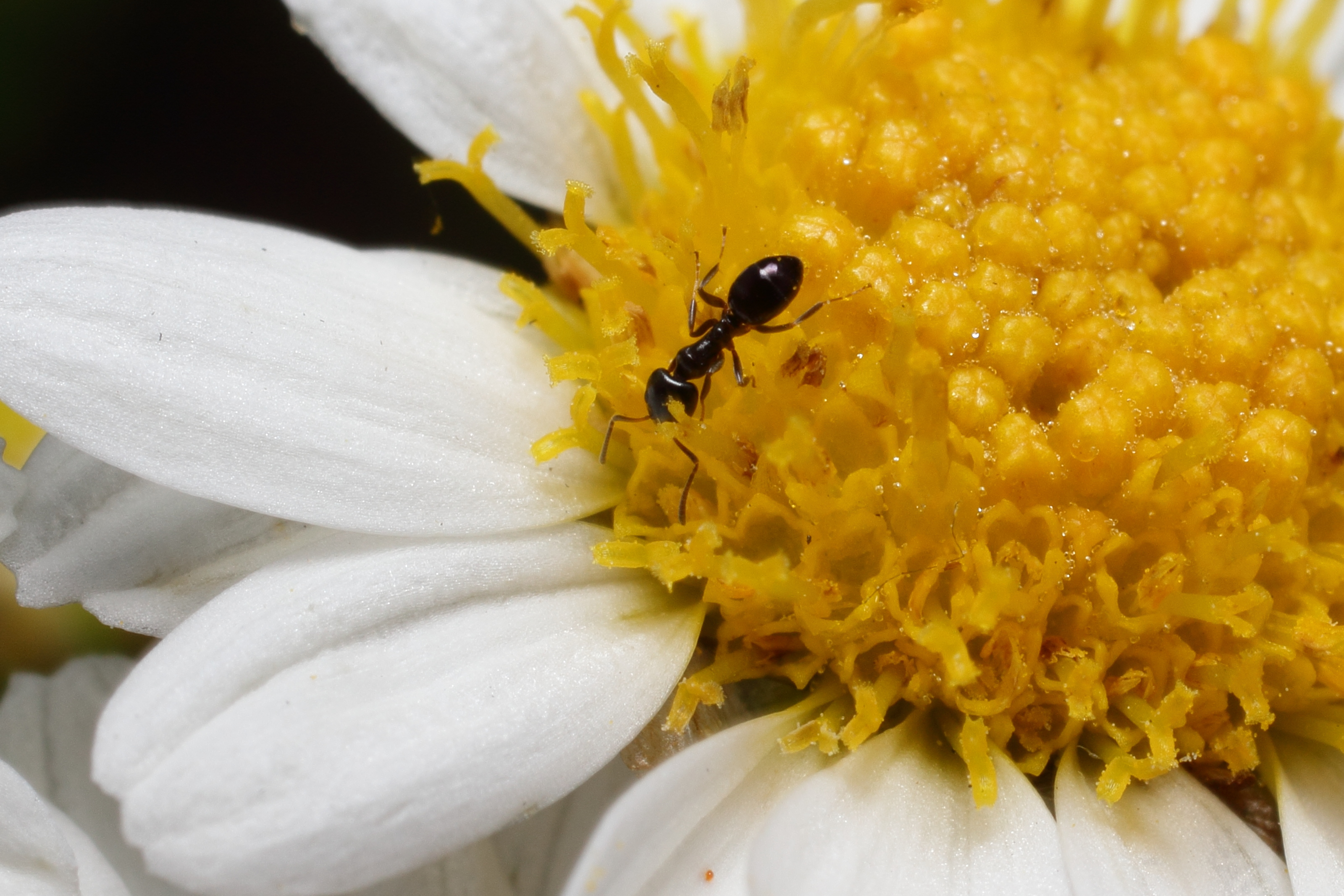
Ochetellus worker visiting a flower

Workers form foraging columns in search of food. They forage into buildings, eucalyptus trees, ground areas or on low vegetation. Workers are both diurnal and nocturnal, but they are not active throughout any 24-hour period. Low activity occurs during clear sunny days; however, colonies are extremely active shortly after rain.

Ochetellus ants are omnivores that feed primarily on arthropods, but they show a preference for fluids and sweets when they enter human houses. Workers will prey on Ornithoptera richmondia eggs, fruit fly pupae, Plutella larvae and attack wasp nests. Honeydew, nectar, Pacific reef heron feces, carrion, Pandanus fruits, plants, seeds, sucrose, fats and grease will also be consumed. O. glaber is known to exploit the extrafloral nectaries on plants without providing protection.

Foraging workers often visit Pisonia flowers and will feed on the nectar. Other flowers they will visit include Canavalia, Commicarpus, Ipomoea, Melanthera, Plumbago and Scaevola. Ochetellus flavipes regularly attends the mealybug Prorsococcus acanthodus and protects it by building shelters. They also attend a number of butterfly larvae, including Anthene lycaenoides (Pale Ciliate Blue), Ogyris amaryllis (Satin Azure), Ogyris olane (Olane Azure) and Ogyris oroetes (Silky Azure).

Predators such as other ants and the thorny devil lizard (Moloch horridus) predominantly feed on Ochetellus workers; the number of ants that a thorny devil can consume per minute is around 24 to 45. The total number of ants consumed in a day can be as many as 2,500 individuals, based on an examination of the lizard's stomach contents.

During the nuptial flight, a queen may mate with multiple males, while the males will only mate with a single queen, making them monogynous. However, Ochetellus glaber queens will only mate with a single male, making them polygynous. Sometimes, colonies proliferate by "budding" (also called "satelliting" or "fractionating"), where a subset of the colony including queens, workers and brood (eggs, larvae and pupae) leave the main colony for an alternative nest site.

== See also ==
- List of ants of Australia
