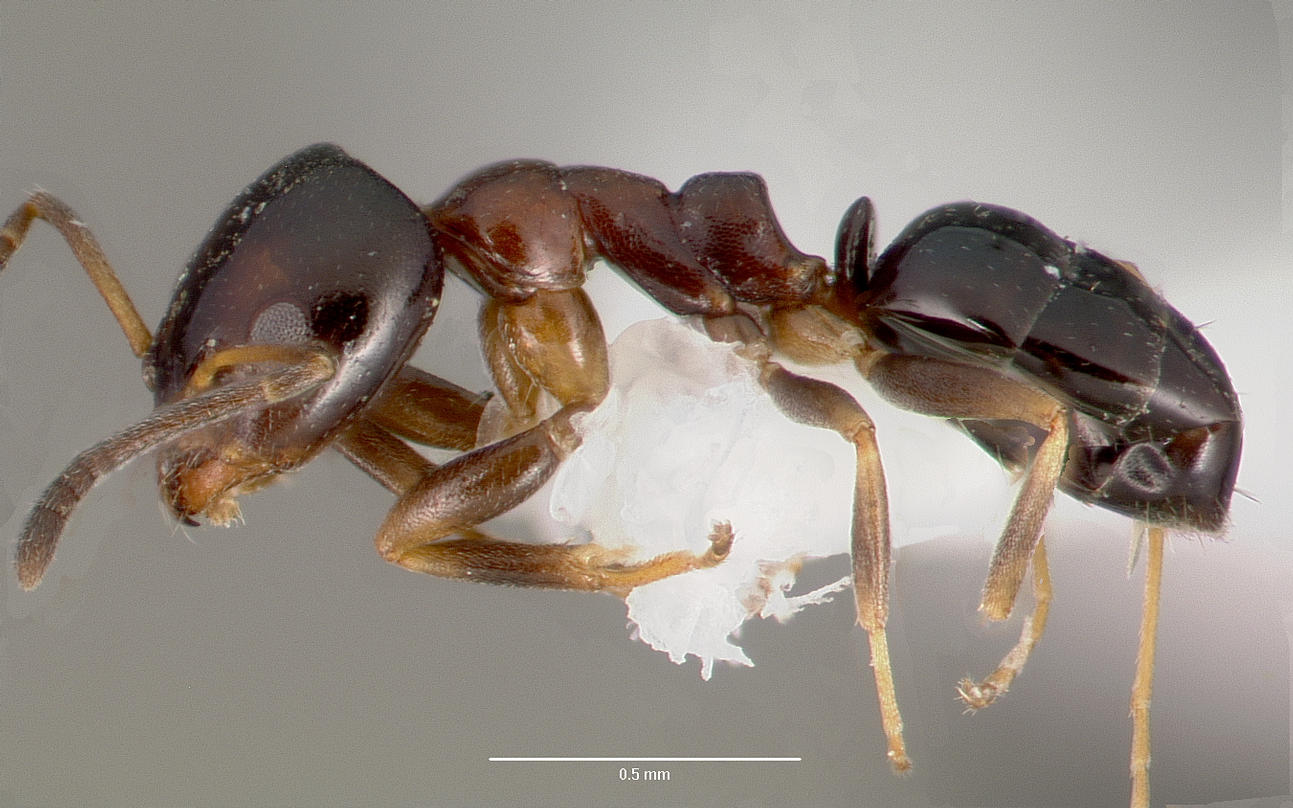
- Ochetellus glaber worker

Scientific classification
- Kingdom: Animalia
- Phylum: Arthropoda
- Clade: Pancrustacea
- Class: Insecta
- Order: Hymenoptera
- Family: Formicidae
- Subfamily: Dolichoderinae
- Genus: Ochetellus
- Species: O. glaber

Binomial name
- Ochetellus glaber (Mayr, 1862)

Subspecies
- Ochetellus glaber clarithorax Forel, 1902; Ochetellus glaber consimilis Viehmeyer, 1914; Ochetellus glaber sommeri Forel, 1902

Synonyms
- Iridomyrmex itoi Forel, 1900; Iridomyrmex itoi abbotti Wheeler, W.M., 1906

= Ochetellus glaber =

Species of ant

Ochetellus glaber, also known as the black household ant, is a species of ant native to Australia. A member of the genus Ochetellus in the subfamily Dolichoderinae, it was described by Austrian entomologist Gustav Mayr in 1862. O. glaber has been introduced to a number of countries, including China, India, Japan, New Zealand, the Philippines and the United States, where it has established itself in Hawaii and Florida. It has been found on Lord Howe Island, New Caledonia, Norfolk Island, Réunion, and the Solomon Islands. Compared with other ants, O. glaber is a small species, with workers measuring 2–3 mm (0.079–0.118 in). Males are the smallest at 1.6 mm (0.063 in), while the queens measure 5.2–5.5 mm (0.20–0.22 in). The ant's colour ranges from brown to black.

Described as an arboreal nesting species, O. glaber lives in open or savannah woodland areas, nesting under stones, old dry logs, rotten wood, and in hollow trees and plant stems. Nests can also be constructed in buildings and structures, specifically in pavings, ceilings and walls. It is both diurnal and nocturnal, forming long trails from trees in search of food such as honeydew and insects. It has developed some associations with certain flowers and also tends to associate with some insects, such as mealybugs and aphids. During the nuptial flight, queens mate with either one or multiple males; males only mate with a single queen. Sometimes, a subset of a colony may leave the main colony for an alternative nest site as an act of dispersal. O. glaber often invades human homes to feed on household foods, and is considered a household pest. It has been intercepted numerous times in the United States, where it has the potential to disrupt the biological control of certain pests and cause long-term ecological impacts in areas where it is not native.

== Taxonomy ==
Ochetellus glaber was originally described as Hypoclinea glabra by Austrian entomologist Gustav Mayr in his "Myrmecologische studien" in 1862. He described it from syntype workers and males that he collected from Sydney, Australia, and which are preserved in the Natural History Museum, London. Mayr transferred it to the genus Iridomyrmex as Iridomyrmex glaber in 1865. Its placement in Iridomyrmex was accepted for more than a century, until entomologist Steve Shattuck revised the genus in 1992 and transferred the species to a new genus, Ochetellus. He designated O. glaber as the type species of the genus. In 2011, evidence emerged that O. glaber represents a species complex, indicating that the current taxa may need to be split.

O. glaber has two synonyms, Iridomyrmex itoi, and the subspecies Iridomyrmex itoi abbotti. The subspecies was synonymised with I. itoi in 1910. In the 1950s I. itoi was first noted to be similar to O. glaber. Despite the similarities, I. itoi remained a valid species until a 1995 publication confirmed its synonymy with O. glaber.

It is commonly known as the black house ant or the tramp ant.

== Description ==
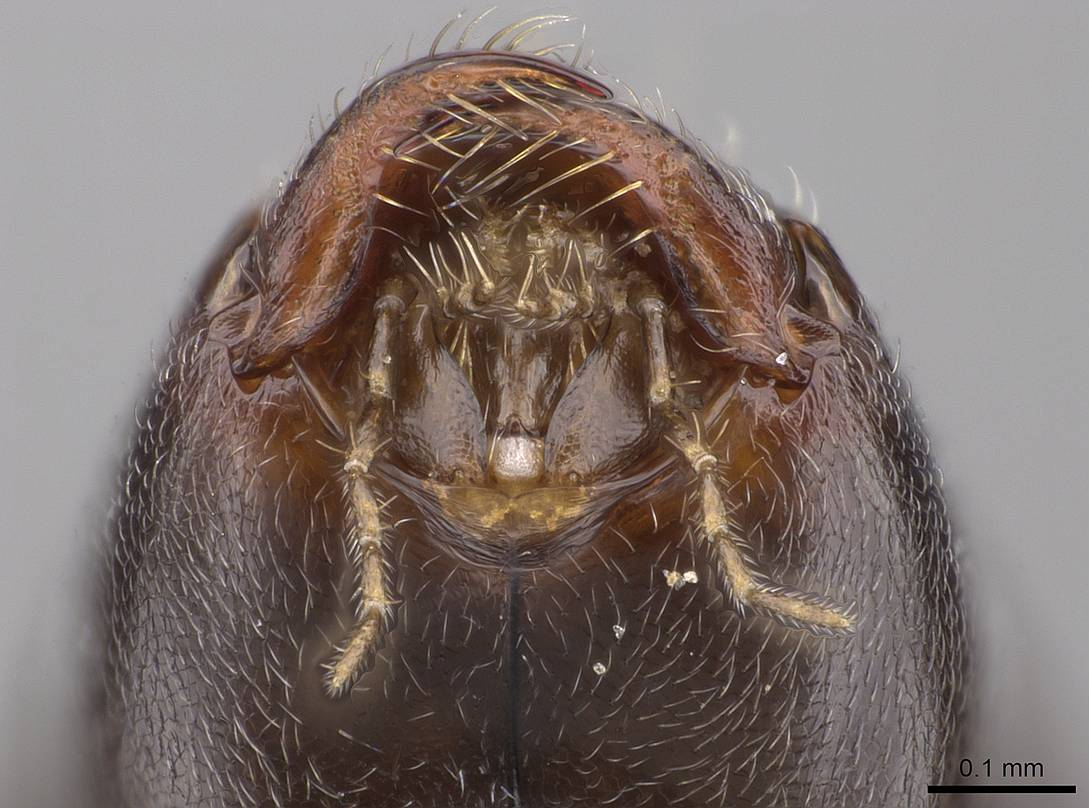
Mouthparts of O. glaber worker

O. glaber is small, with workers measuring 2–3 mm (0.079–0.118 in). The antenna has 12 segments, the scapes of which are half as long as the head. Its antennal sockets and posterior clypeal margin are separated from one another by a small distance, perhaps less than the minimum width of the antennal scapes. Eyes range in size, being either medium to large, with more than six facets (lenses that make up the compound eye of an insect). The dorsum of the mesosoma has distinct metanotal grooves and lack erect hairs. The propodeum has a distinct protrusion which causes the slope to be strongly concave. The ant's waist has only one segment. The petiole (the narrow waist) is upright and is not flattened. The gaster has a ventral slit. Constriction between the third and fourth abdominal segment is not visible. The ant's colour ranges from brown to black. Males are smaller than the workers, measuring 1.6 millimetres (0.063 in). The body is brown in colour, but the back of the body is brownish-black, and the mandibles, legs and antennae are yellow. The head and thorax are noticeably wrinkled. O. glaber queens are larger than the males and workers, measuring 5.2–5.5 millimetres (0.20–0.22 in).

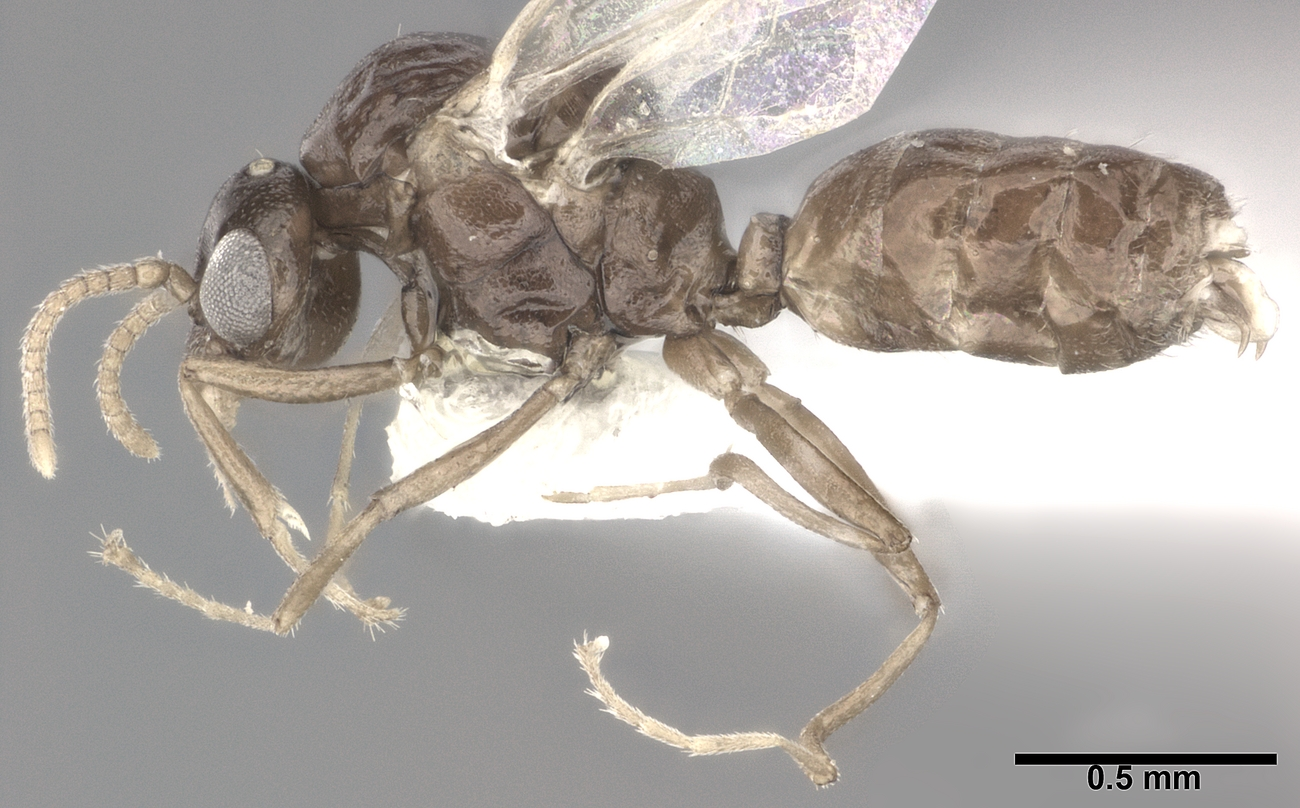
Side view of a male

A young larva is 1.4 mm (0.055 in). Compared to older larvae, young larva bodies are stouter and the outlines are straighter. Thirteen differentiated somites are present. Spinules (small spines or thorns) are more prominent at the posterior end. The length of the body hair is extremely short, measuring 0.002–0.015mm long. Mature larvae are larger, measuring 3.9 mm (0.15 in). The body is short and stout. The integument (a tough outer protective layer of an organism) are spinulose, bearing small spines. These spinules are in short transverse rows both ventrally and posteriorly. Body hair is significant but few hairs are found on the head. Mandibles contain a large apical tooth. The maxillary and labial palps (organs which aid sensory function in eating) have three sensilla (a sensory organ protruding from the cuticle). Unlike other Dolichoderines, the larvae are yellow, not white.

The karyotype of O. glaber has been described. It has eight metacentric chromosomes, four submetacentric to acrocentric, and two submetacentric chromosomes.

=== Subspecies ===
Three subspecies of O. glaber are recognised: O. glaber clarithorax, O. glaber consimilis and O. glaber sommeri.

Subspecies of O. glaber
Subspecies	Description	Image
O. glaber clarithorax	O. glaber clarithorax differs from O. glaber by the appearance of its thorax and parts of the legs, which are of a reddish-yellow colour. The back of the metanotum is brown. The queen measures 5 mm (0.20 in), and its thorax is reddish-brown. The front of the head, as well as the legs and antennae, are also reddish-brown. Specimens of O. glaber clarithorax have been collected from multiple locations, specifically Brisbane in Queensland and Sydney in New South Wales.	
O. glaber consimilis	O. glaber consimilis is distinguished from O. glaber by its wider head and more convex and rounded sides in the rear regions. Its widest width lies farther forward and the posterior margin is narrower. The basal surface of the epinotum (the middle segment of the thorax) is longer and its surface is steeper and more concave. The gaster is either black or bronze, the legs are darkened, and the mandibles, scapes (the elongated basal segment of the antenna), trochanter (body part of the leg which is attached to the femur) and tarsus (the bottom part of an insect's leg) are reddish-yellow. O. glaber sommeri shares similar colouration with O. glaber consimilis, but the ant has a wider head, is more robust, and the epinotum differentiates slightly. Specimens of O. glaber consimilis have been collected from the Rawlinson Range in Papua New Guinea.	
O. glaber sommeri	O. glaber sommeri measures 2.4 mm (0.094 in). The ant is black, with the articulations of the legs and the base of the scapes being reddish. Compared to O. glaber, O. glaber sommeri is more robust and has a smaller head. The subspecies was collected from New Caledonia.	

== Distribution and habitat ==
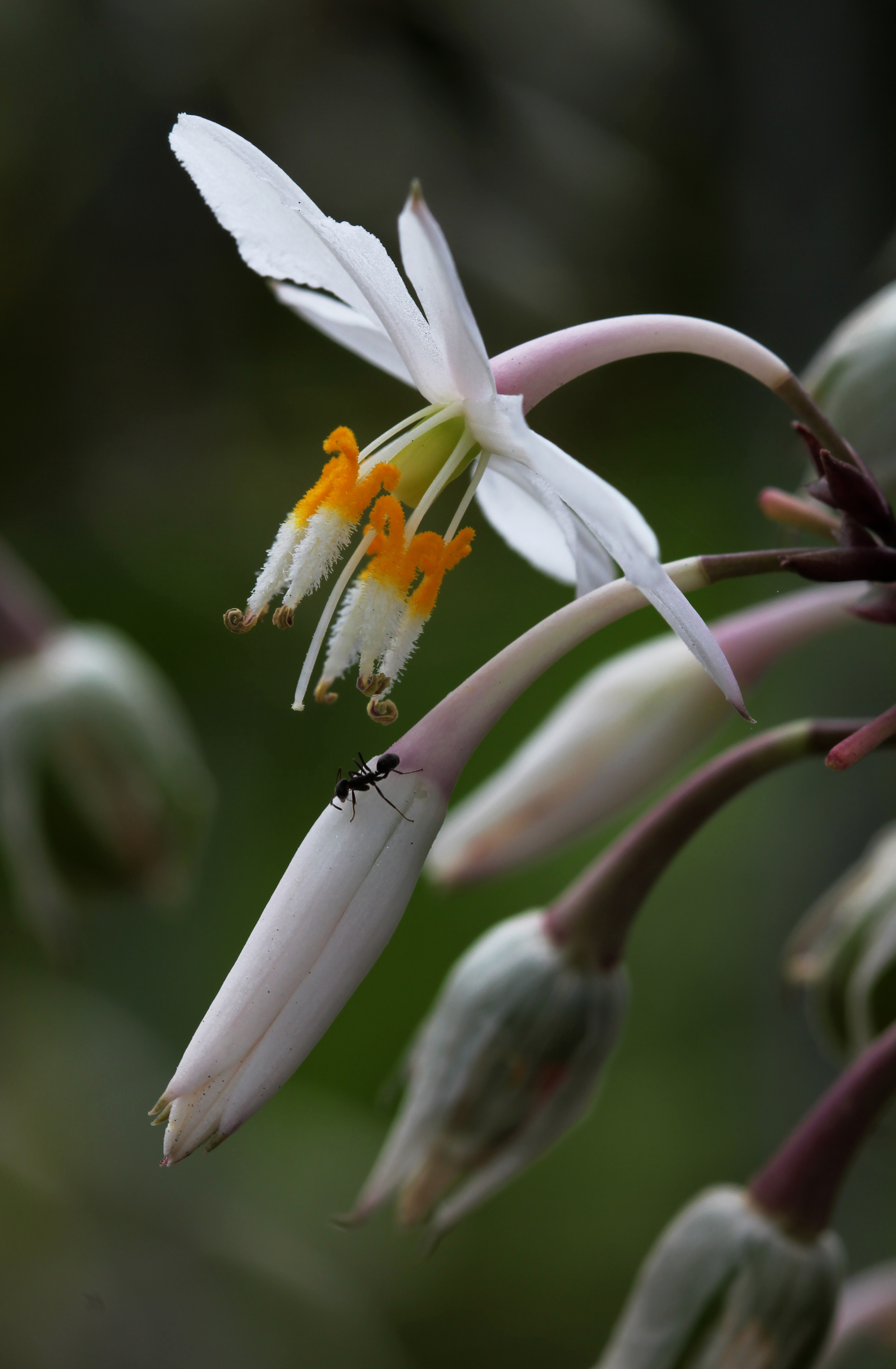
Worker foraging on an Arthropodium cirrhatum flower in Auckland, New Zealand

O. glaber is native to Australia, where its range extends from coastal Queensland and New South Wales to south-west Western Australia.

O. glaber was introduced to New Zealand around 1927 and had become well-established by the 1940s. While the ant has largely remained in Auckland and some suburbs, New Zealand authorities have intercepted specimens elsewhere several times, and it may spread to other New Zealand cities. It is regarded as a potential pest, though not a major household one.

In the United States, O. glaber was first recorded in Hawaii in 1977, where it originated from Australia and Japan. In Hawaii, it is presently found on Kauai, Maui, Oahu, and the Island of Hawaii. It was also found in Florida, where collected specimens were found in a queen palm (Syagrus romanzoffiana) stump. It is an abundant yet localised species in Orange County, Florida, being found in dead wood or in tussocks of marsh grasses.

In the South Pacific, specimens of O. glaber have also been collected on Lord Howe Island, New Caledonia, Norfolk Island, Solomon Islands and the former New Hebrides. Elsewhere, it has been found in Réunion, the Philippines, China, Macao, Japan and Sri Lanka. In India, it has been collected from the states of Haryana, Himachal Pradesh, Karnataka, Maharashtra and Uttarakhand.

O. glaber is an arboreal nesting species. It lives in open areas or savannah woodland, nesting under stones or old dry logs, or in hollow trees, plant stems or rotten wood. It is also often found in gardens, where it may be conspicuous. O. glaber has been found in mountain forests, wet forests, in pastures, garden flower tubs and dried palmetto frond. It is found at altitudes of between 5 and 1,585 m (16 and 5,200 ft) above sea level. In buildings and structures, O. glaber nests in crevices and cavities such as rockeries, paving and in brickwork. It also nests in ceilings, walls, and subfloor areas.

== Behaviour and ecology ==
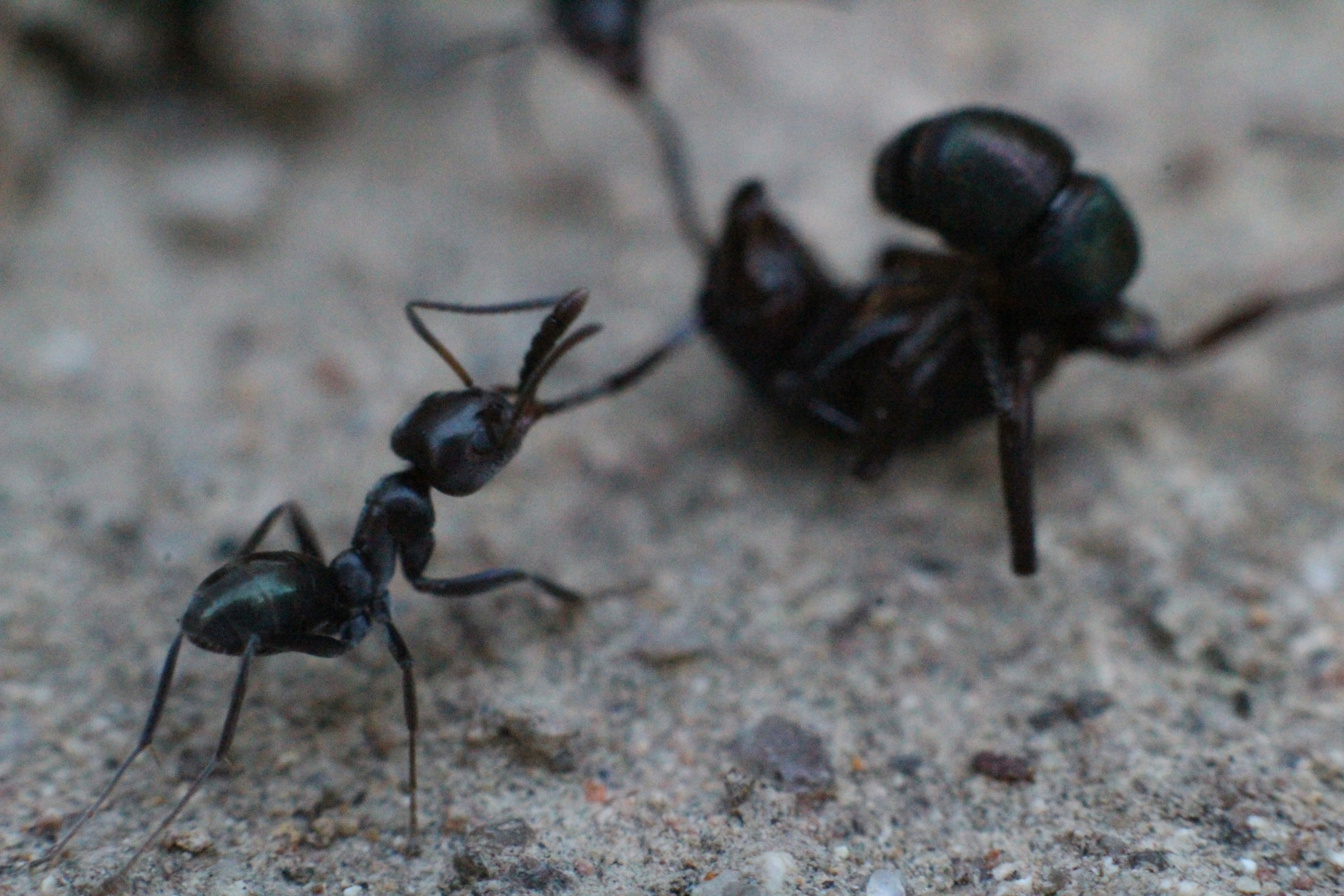
O. glaber (left) attacking a green-head ant (Rhytidoponera metallica)

O. glaber is omnivorous, forming long trails on tree trunks to seek sweet substances such as honeydew and to hunt insects. The ant is active both in the day and night. Activity increases during the night or on overcast days, peaking during early mornings and late evening to early night. Nocturnal activity varies but is either minimal or non-existent. O. glaber consumes carcasses of dead birds, sea turtles, parrot fish, fruit fly pupae and diamondback moth larvae. It also has a preference for fat, grease, plants and seeds. Galleries of the Formosan subterranean termite (Coptotermes formosanus) are often invaded by O. glaber, although mortality rates are substantially higher when big-headed ants (Pheidole megacephala) invade termite galleries.

The ant has developed associations with a range of organisms. Foraging workers often visit flowers for nectar, chiefly those of Pisonia, but also of Canavalia, Commicarpus, Ipomoea, Melanthera, Plumbago and Scaevola. O. glaber also associates with some insects, including the pineapple mealybug (Dysmicoccus brevipes) and aphids, which they import and tend with other bugs on domestic pot plants. O. glaber associates indirectly with Ananusia australis, an encyrtid parasitoid wasp.

During the nuptial flight, a queen may mate with multiple males, while the males will mate with only the one queen, making them monogynous. Colonies sometimes proliferate by "budding" (also called "satelliting" or "fractionating"), where a subset of the colony, including queens, workers and brood (eggs, larvae and pupae), leave the main colony for an alternative nest site.

== Relationship with humans ==
O. glaber is viewed as a pest. Although it does not sting, it bites and, when crushed, produces a strong odour. It enters human homes to gather food, tracking across ceilings, beams and joists and drops ant debris onto surfaces below. The ant can also quickly spread because of its high reproduction and dispersal potential.

O. glaber is more potentially dangerous in some places than in others. The United States, and especially the state of California, prohibits the ant from entering lest it should disrupt the country's ecosystems. Its relationship with honeydew-producing insects and consumption of parasitoids could disrupt the biological control of certain pests, risking long-term ecological damage that could reduce biodiversity, disrupt natural communities, or change ecosystem processes. Therefore, the California Department of Food and Agriculture have intercepted the ant in nursery stock and fresh plants from Hawaii. California is especially vulnerable to O. glaber infestation because the state's climate resembles that of those regions where the ant already lives. Nonetheless, O. glaber is unlikely to lower crop yields, increase farming costs, degrade water supplies, or likely disrupt Californian agricultural commodity markets.

In New Zealand, the ant is often found in urban gardens and occasionally in houses.
