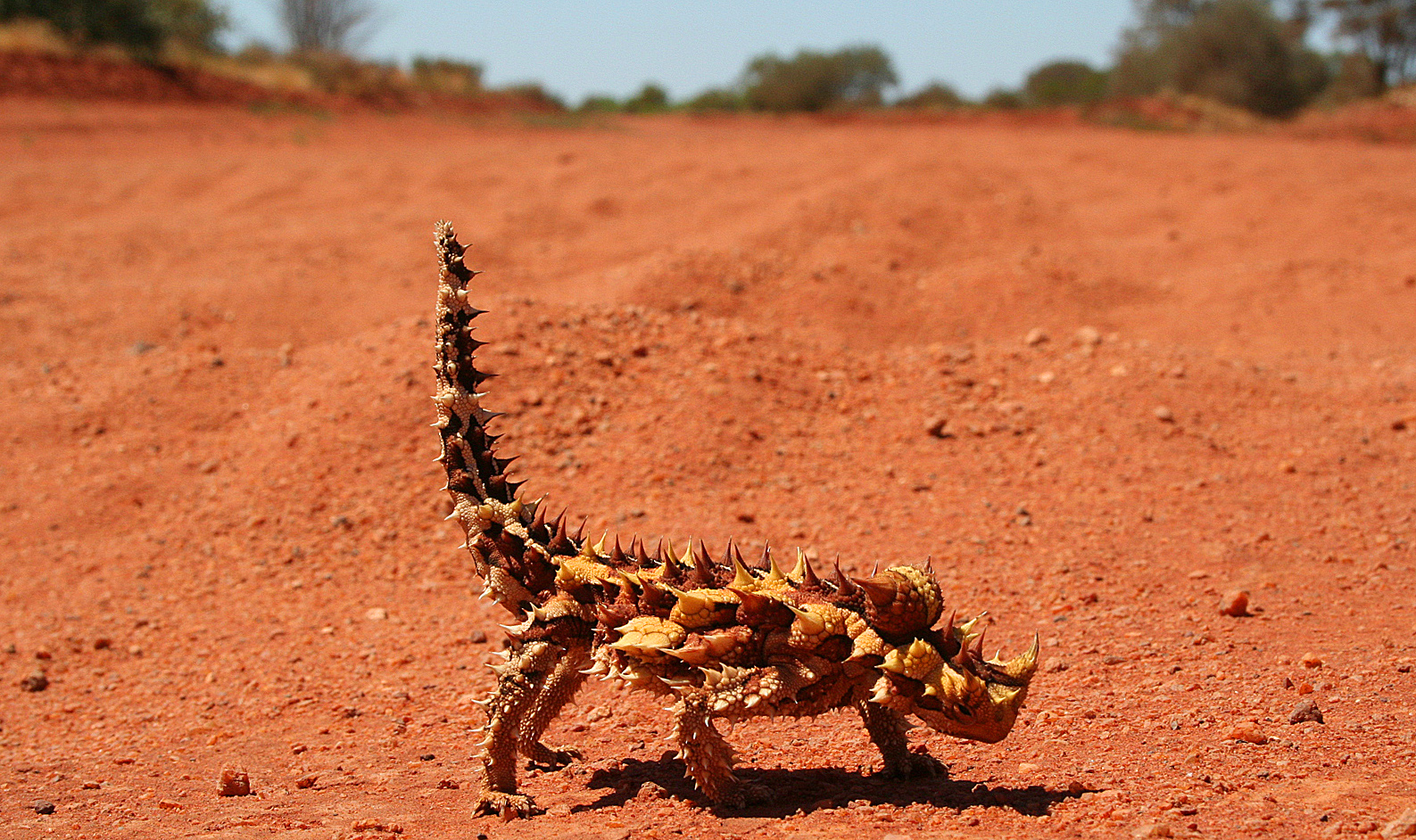

Conservation status
- Least Concern (IUCN 3.1)

Scientific classification
- Kingdom: Animalia
- Phylum: Chordata
- Order: Squamata
- Suborder: Iguania
- Family: Agamidae
- Subfamily: Amphibolurinae
- Genus: Moloch; Gray, 1841
- Species: M. horridus

Binomial name
- Moloch horridus Gray, 1841
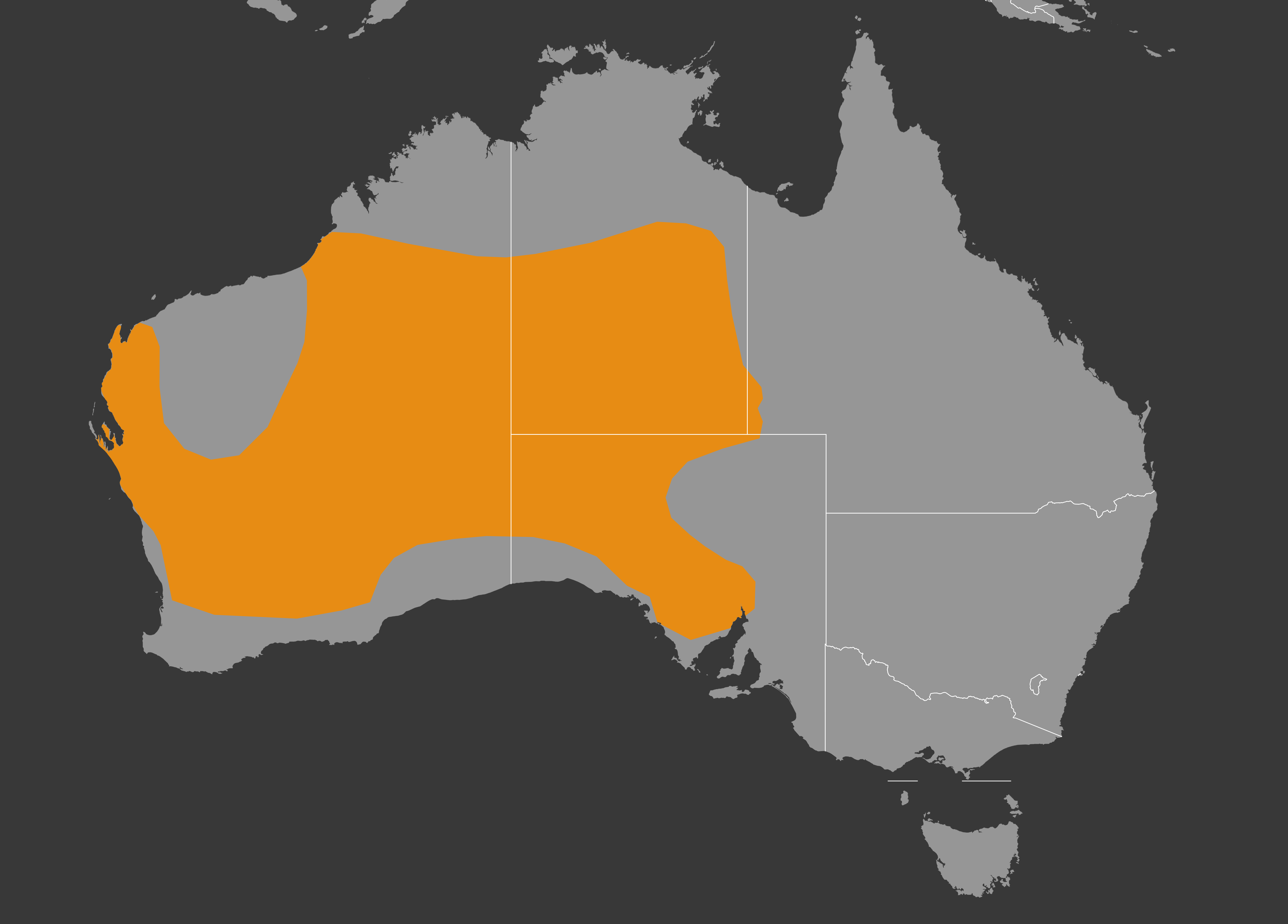
- Distribution of Moloch horridus

Synonyms
- Acanthosaura gibbosus

= Thorny devil =

Species of lizard

The thorny devil (Moloch horridus), also known commonly as the mountain devil, thorny lizard, thorny dragon, and moloch, is a species of lizard in the family Agamidae. The species is endemic to Australia. It is the sole species in the genus Moloch. It grows up to 21 cm (8.3 in) in total length (including tail), with females generally larger than males.

== Taxonomy ==
The thorny devil was first described by the biologist John Edward Gray in 1841. While it is the only species contained in the genus Moloch, many taxonomists suspect another species might remain to be found in the wild. The thorny devil is only distantly related to the morphologically similar North American horned lizards of the genus Phrynosoma. This similarity is usually thought of as an example of convergent evolution.

The names given to this lizard reflect its appearance: the two large horned scales on its head complete the illusion of a dragon or devil. The name Moloch was used for a deity of the ancient Near East, usually depicted as a hideous beast. The thorny devil also has other nicknames people have given it such as the "devil lizard", "horned lizard", and the "thorny toad".

== Description ==
The thorny devil grows up to 21 cm (8.3 in) in total length (including tail), and can live for 15 to 20 years. The females are larger than the males. Most specimens are coloured in camouflaging shades of desert browns and tans. These colours change from pale colours during warm weather to darker colours during cold weather. The thorny devil is covered entirely with conical spines that are mostly uncalcified.

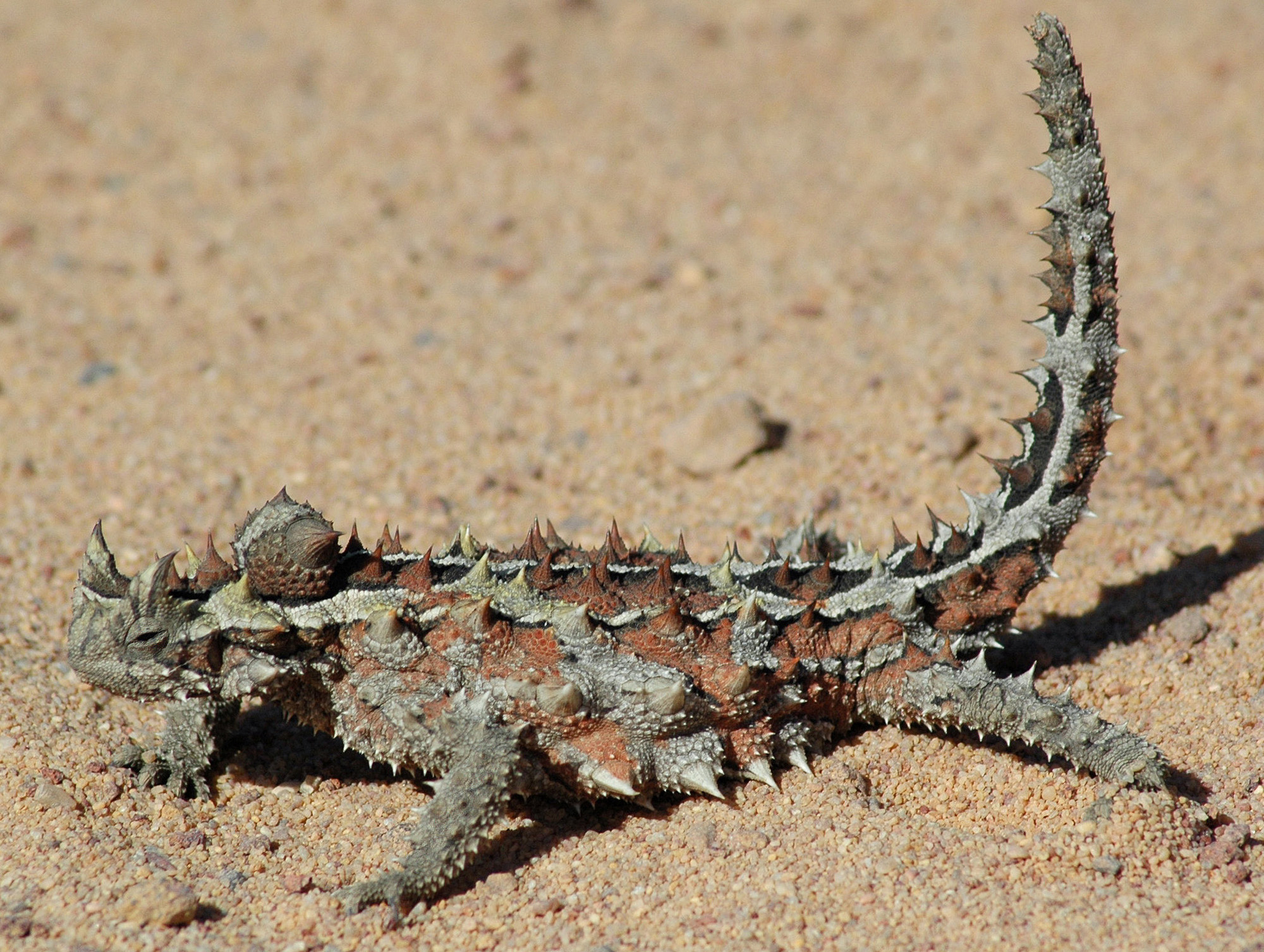
A thorny devil in Western Australia

An intimidating array of spikes covers the entire upper side of the body of the thorny devil. These thorny scales also help to defend it from predators. Camouflage and deception may also be used to evade predation. This lizard's unusual gait involves freezing and rocking as it moves about slowly in search of food, water, and mates.

The thorny devil also features a spiny "false head" on the back of its neck, and the lizard presents this to potential predators by dipping its real head. The "false head" is made of soft tissue.

The thorny devil's scales are ridged, enabling the animal to collect water by simply touching it with any part of the body, usually the limbs; capillary action transports the water to the mouth through channels in its skin. The thorny devil is also equipped to harvest moisture in the dry desert following nighttime's extremely low temperatures and the subsequent condensation of dew. The process involves moisture contact, their hydrophilic skin surface structures with capillaries, and an internal transport mechanism.

- The lizard rubs its body against the moist substrate and shovels damp sand onto its back, the outer epidermis layer equipped to draw in cutaneous moisture.
- The keratinous fibered epidermis is hydrophilic with hexagonal microstructures on the scale surfaces. When trace amounts of water contact its skin (pre-wetting) these microstructures fill with water, the skin surface becoming superhydrophilic. This allows moisture to spread across wider surface areas, yielding faster uptake, as water is collected via capillary action in small channels located between its scales.
- Captured water is transported passively via capillary action in semi-tubular channels located beneath the partially overlapping scales, in an asymmetric and interconnected system that extends over the lizard's entire body surface. The channels terminate at the mouth where active ingestion (drinking) is observable by jaw movements when moisture is plentiful, e.g. water puddles.

The same hydrophilic moisture-harvesting physiology is characteristic in the Texas horned lizard (Phrynosoma cornutum), roundtail horned lizard (Phrynosoma modestum), desert horned lizard (Phrynosoma platyrhinos), Arabian toad-headed agama (Phrynocephalus arabicus), sunwatcher toadhead agama (Phrynocephalus helioscopus), Phrynocephalus horvathi, yellow-spotted agama (Trapelus flavimaculatus), Trapelus pallidus and desert agama (Trapelus mutabilis).

== Distribution and habitat ==
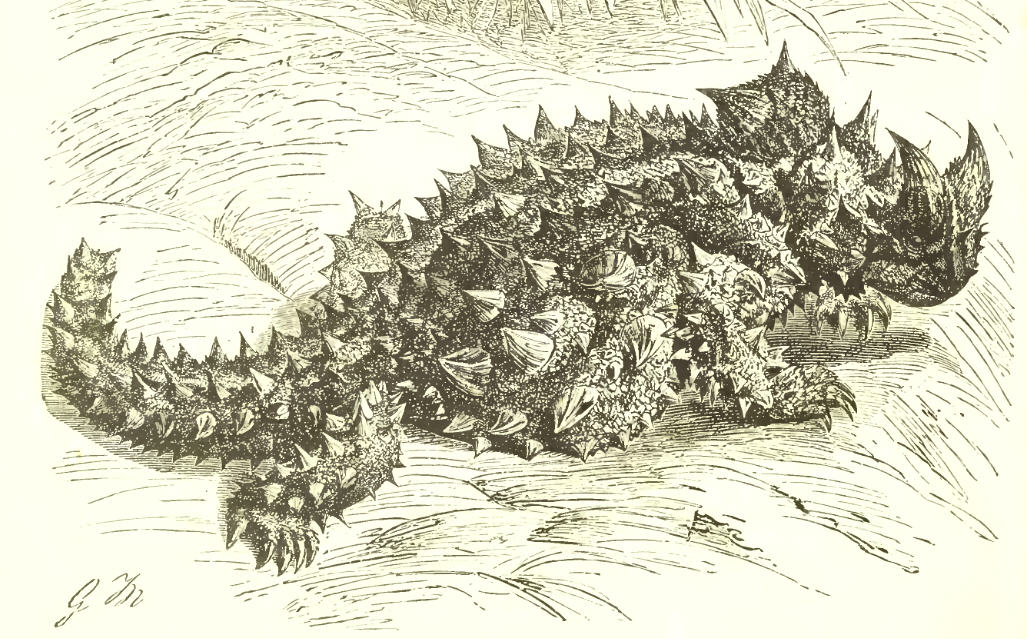
Illustration from Lydekker's The Royal Natural History

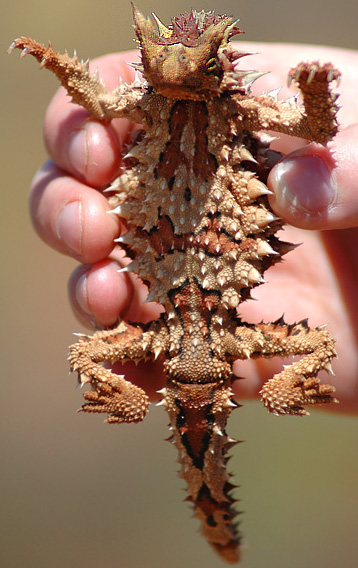
Thorny devil underside, Western Australia

The thorny devil usually lives in the arid scrubland and desert that covers most of central Australia, sandplain and sandridge desert in the deep interior and the mallee belt.

The habitat of the thorny devil coincides more with the regions of sandy loam soils than with a particular climate in Western Australia.

== Self-defense ==
The thorny devil is covered in hard, rather sharp spines that dissuade attacks by predators by making it difficult to swallow. It also has a false head on its back. When it feels threatened by other animals, it lowers its head between its front legs, and then presents its false head. Predators that consume the thorny devil include wild birds and goannas.

== Diet ==
The thorny devil mainly subsists on ants, especially Ochetellus flavipes and other species in the Camponotus, Ectatomma, Iridomyrmex (especially Iridomyrmex rufoniger), Monomorium, Ochetellus, Pheidole, or Polyrhachis genera. Thorny devils often eat thousands of ants in one day.

The thorny devil collects moisture in the dry desert by the condensation of dew. This dew forms on its skin in the early morning as it begins to warm outside. Then the dew is channeled to its mouth by gravity and capillary action via the channels between its spines. During rainfalls, capillary action allows the thorny devil to absorb water from all over its body. Capillary action also allows the thorny devil to absorb water from damp sand. Absorption through sand is the thorny devil's main source of water intake.

== Reproduction ==
The female thorny devil lays a clutch of three to ten eggs between September and December. She puts these in a nesting burrow about 30 cm underground. The eggs hatch after about three to four months.

== Popular reference ==
The popular appeal of the thorny devil is the basis of an anecdotal petty scam. American servicemen stationed in Southwest Australia decades ago (such as during World War II) were supposedly sold the thorny fruits of a species of weeds, the so-called "double gee" (Emex australis), but those were called "thorny devil eggs" as a part of the scam. Thorny devils have been kept in captivity.
