= Iridomyrmex bicknelli =

Scientific classification
- Kingdom: Animalia
- Phylum: Arthropoda
- Clade: Pancrustacea
- Class: Insecta
- Order: Hymenoptera
- Family: Formicidae
- Subfamily: Dolichoderinae
- Genus: Iridomyrmex
- Species: I. bicknelli

Binomial name
- Iridomyrmex bicknelli Emery, 1898

Species of ant

Iridomyrmex bicknelli, also known as the black trail ant, is a species of ant belonging to the genus Iridomyrmex. The species is distributed in every single state and territory in Australia. Iridomyrmex bicknelli was described by Emery in 1898.

== Subspecies ==
- Iridomyrmex bicknelli formosae Forel, 1912
- Iridomyrmex bicknelli luteus Forel, 1915

== Description ==
=== Size ===
Queen: 7mm- 10mm in length

Worker- 2- 5mm in length.

== Behaviour ==
Workers are not aggressive, and do not have a stinger or spray formic acid. In the wild, queens are known to be polygynous with very high worker numbers. However, in a formicarium colonies are mainly monogynous with an average of 10,000 workers per colony. Queens are fully claustral, meaning they do not have nest entrances during the founding stage of a colony. They also do not require feeding during this time, as they live on fat reserves from their own body.
