= Ochetellus sororis =

Scientific classification
- Domain: Eukaryota
- Kingdom: Animalia
- Phylum: Arthropoda
- Class: Insecta
- Order: Hymenoptera
- Family: Formicidae
- Subfamily: Dolichoderinae
- Genus: Ochetellus
- Species: O. sororis

Binomial name
- Ochetellus sororis (W. M. Mann, 1921)

Species of ant

Ochetellus sororis is a species of ant in the genus Ochetellus. Described by William M. Mann in 1921, the species is endemic to Fiji.
