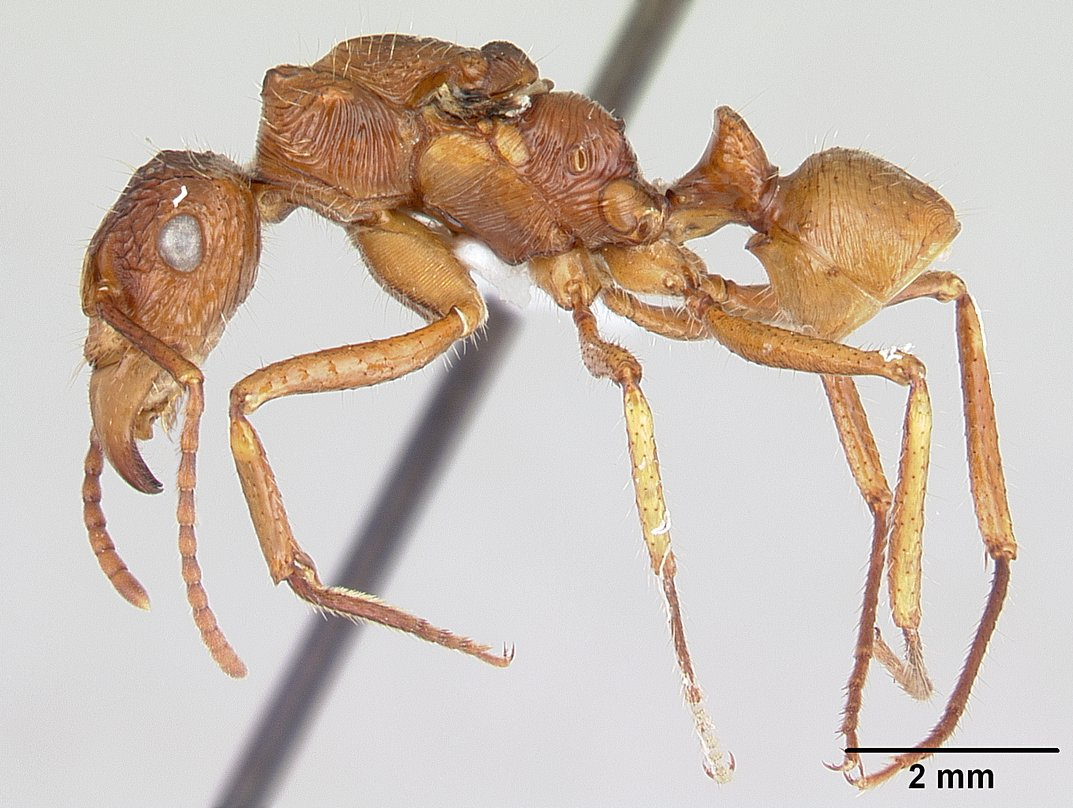
- Ectatomma parasiticum dealate queen

Scientific classification
- Kingdom: Animalia
- Phylum: Arthropoda
- Class: Insecta
- Order: Hymenoptera
- Family: Formicidae
- Genus: Ectatomma
- Species: E. parasiticum

Binomial name
- Ectatomma parasiticum Feitosa & Fresnau, 2008

= Ectatomma parasiticum =

Species of ant

Ectatomma parasiticum is a species of ant in the subfamily Ectatomminae. Known from Mexico, the species is a social parasite of the related species Ectatomma tuberculatum. It is the only parasitic species described in the Ectatomminae subfamily, and among the rare inquilines from the tropics.

== Parasitism ==
Ectatomma parasiticum shares several life-history traits with other workerless inquiline ants: rarity, local distribution, variation in abundance, limited dispersal, intracolonial mating, queen miniaturization, morphological similarity with its host, and almost exclusive production of sexual forms. Some of these parasitic traits, the polygynous population of the host, and the association between sibling species are arguments which may support the hypothesis of sympatric speciation. Despite a possible recent divergence of the social parasite from its host, E. parasiticum can be discriminated by its host, and then potentially rejected. Nevertheless, most parasites elicited interest and attractiveness from the host, probably because of their peculiar chemical profile (a weak chemical signature) and/or their reproductive status.

Fénéron et al. (2013) suggested that E. parasiticum could have conserved from its host sibling species the queen-specific substances that produce attracting and settling effect on workers, then making the exploitation of the host easier. However, recognition in ants is a multi-component system which encodes different types of information, but not independently of one another. For example, it has been suggested that fertility signal interferes with the production or the perception of colony-specific cues in Camponotus floridanus. In case of E. parasiticum, host worker attractiveness due to the queen-specific substance could, in return, increase the probability to be detected as carrying distinct recognition cues, and then to be attacked by the most discriminating host workers. This hypothesis would explain why the social integration of the parasite into host colonies is imperfect.
