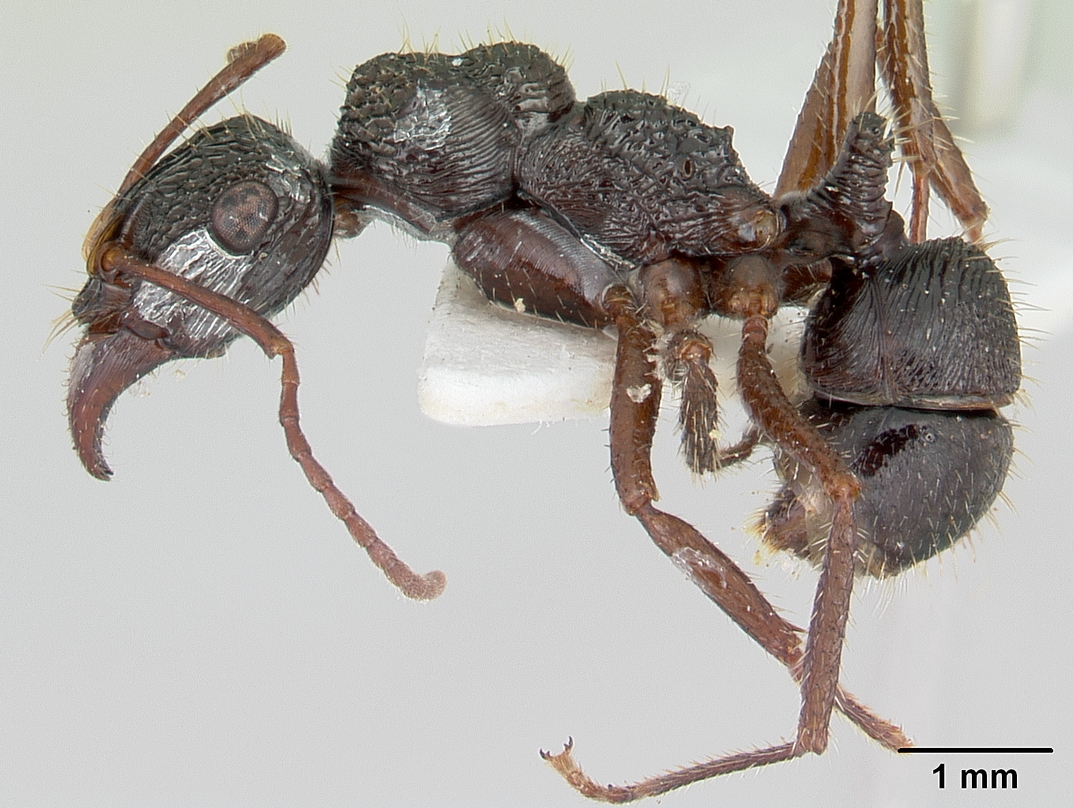
- Ectatomma ruidum worker from Venezuela

Scientific classification
- Domain: Eukaryota
- Kingdom: Animalia
- Phylum: Arthropoda
- Class: Insecta
- Order: Hymenoptera
- Family: Formicidae
- Genus: Ectatomma
- Species: E. ruidum

Binomial name
- Ectatomma ruidum (Roger, 1860)

= Ectatomma ruidum =

Species of ant

Ectatomma ruidum is a Neotropical species of ant in the subfamily Ectatomminae.

== Habitat and distribution ==
The species is found from southern Mexico to Brazil, from sea level to an altitude of 1500–1600 m, and is dominant in several ecosystems such as forests, or economically important cultivated areas. It is diurnal, earth-dwelling and nests in the soil. A study by Vásquez-Ordóñez et al. (2012) showed that a lower density of E. ruidum nests was found in the woodlands compared to the grasslands. These observations are consistent with those for the departments of Valle del Cauca and Cauca, but not for La Guajira, a drier region in the extreme north of Colombia, where a high abundance of E. ruidum nests was found in areas with higher presence of trees.

== Parasitism ==
Two species of Kapala (Eucharitidae) have been reported to parasitize this ant in Mexico, and parasitism of E. ruidum by Kapala sp. is also known from Colombia.

== Kleptoparasitism ==
Ectatomma ruidum is reported to engage heavily in kleptoparasitism (thievery) of food from neighbouring nests. To achieve this, specialised workers mimic the cuticular hydrocarbon profile of the target nest.
