= Ectatomin =

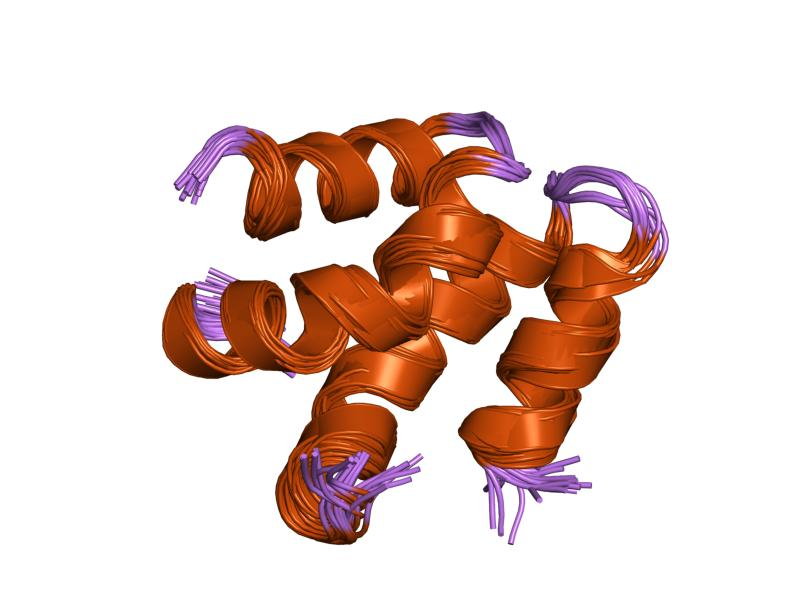
- ectatomin (water solution, nmr 20 structures)

Identifiers
- Symbol: Ectatomin
- Pfam: PF06457
- InterPro: IPR009458
- SCOP2: 1eci / SCOPe / SUPFAM
- OPM superfamily: 74
- OPM protein: 1eci
Available protein structures:
- PDB: IPR009458 PF06457 (ECOD; PDBsum)
- AlphaFold: IPR009458; PF06457

Ectatomin is a protein toxin from the venom of the ant Ectatomma tuberculatum. Ectatomin can efficiently insert into the plasma membrane, where it can form channels. Ectatomin was shown to inhibit L-type calcium currents in isolated rat cardiac myocytes. In these cells, ectatomin induces a gradual, irreversible increase in ion leakage across the membrane, which can lead to cell death.

Ectatomin is composed of two subunits, A and B, which are homologous. The structure of ectatomin reveals that each subunit consists of two alpha helices with a connecting hinge region, which form a hairpin structure that is stabilized by disulfide bridges. A disulfide bridge between the hinge regions of the two subunits links the heterodimer together, forming a closed bundle of four alpha helices with a left-handed twist.
