= Ochetellus epinotalis =

Scientific classification
- Domain: Eukaryota
- Kingdom: Animalia
- Phylum: Arthropoda
- Class: Insecta
- Order: Hymenoptera
- Family: Formicidae
- Subfamily: Dolichoderinae
- Genus: Ochetellus
- Species: O. epinotalis

Binomial name
- Ochetellus epinotalis (Viehmeyer, 1914)

Species of ant

Ochetellus epinotalis is a species of ant in the genus Ochetellus. Described by Viehmeyer in 1914, the species is endemic to New Guinea.
