= Ochetellus democles =

Scientific classification
- Kingdom: Animalia
- Phylum: Arthropoda
- Class: Insecta
- Order: Hymenoptera
- Family: Formicidae
- Subfamily: Dolichoderinae
- Genus: Ochetellus
- Species: O. democles

Binomial name
- Ochetellus democles (Walker, 1839)

Species of ant

Ochetellus democles is a species of ant in the genus Ochetellus. Described by Francis Walker in 1839, the ant was originally thought to be a small wasp based on a male collected by Charles Darwin. It was first recognised as an ant in 1988.
