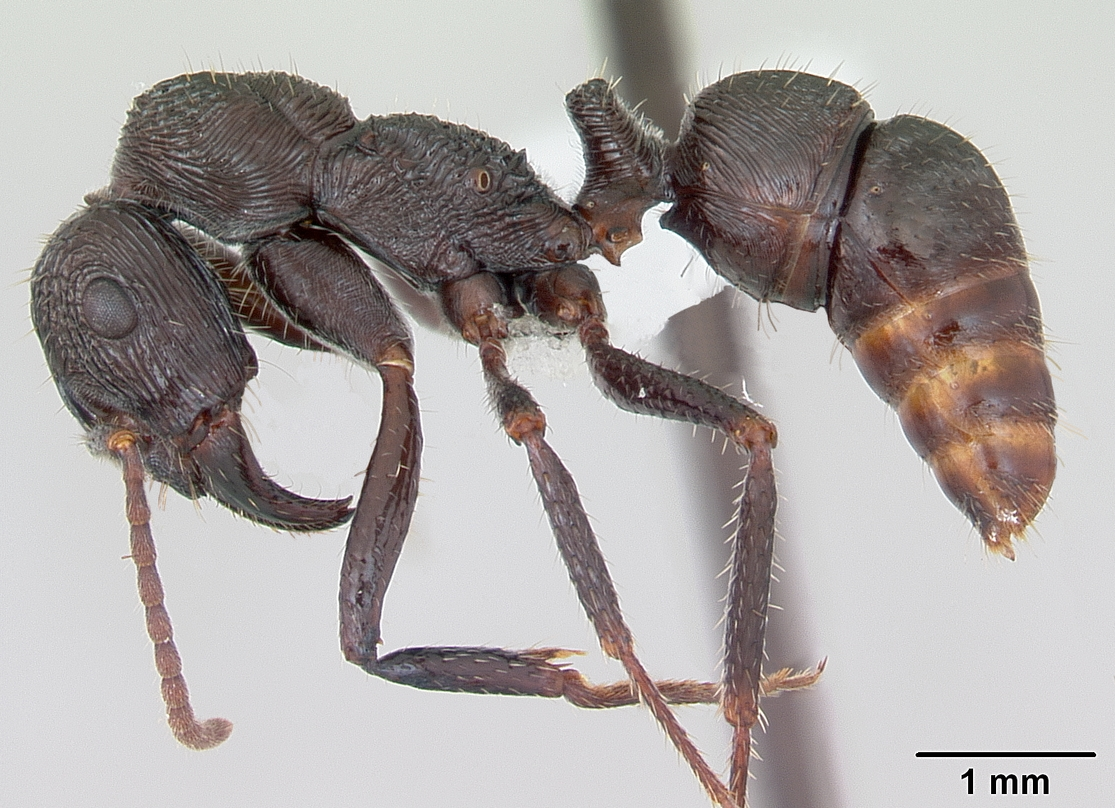

Scientific classification
- Domain: Eukaryota
- Kingdom: Animalia
- Phylum: Arthropoda
- Class: Insecta
- Order: Hymenoptera
- Family: Formicidae
- Genus: Ectatomma
- Species: E. edentatum

Binomial name
- Ectatomma edentatum Roger, 1863

= Ectatomma edentatum =

Species of ant

Ectatomma edentatum is a species of ant. Division of labor in this species is related to age, with younger ants caring for larvae and older ants foraging.
