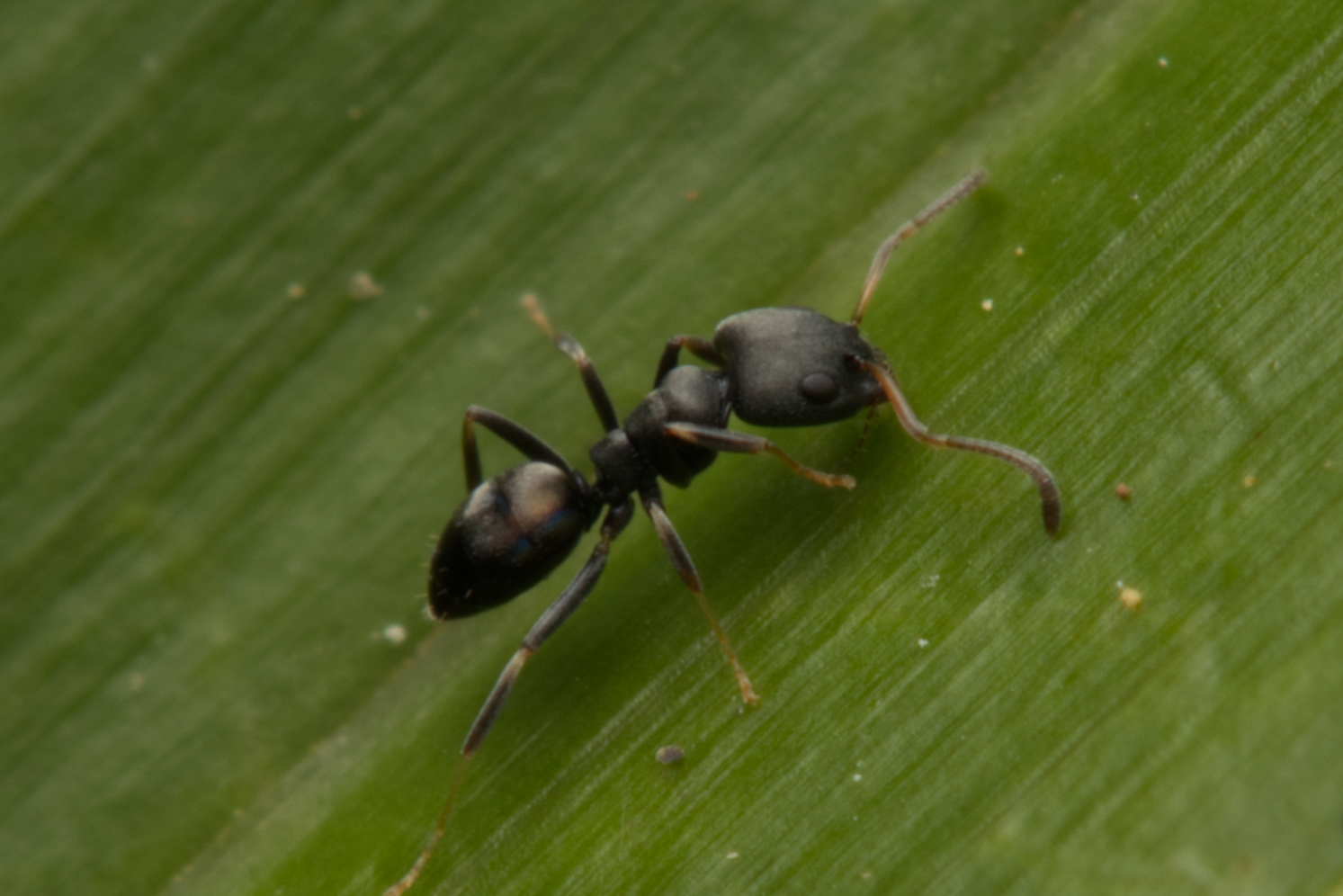

Scientific classification
- Kingdom: Animalia
- Phylum: Arthropoda
- Class: Insecta
- Order: Hymenoptera
- Family: Formicidae
- Subfamily: Dolichoderinae
- Genus: Ochetellus
- Species: O. punctatissimus

Binomial name
- Ochetellus punctatissimus (Emery, 1887)

= Ochetellus punctatissimus =

Species of ant

Ochetellus punctatissimus is a species of ant in the genus Ochetellus. Described by Carlo Emery in 1887, the ant is endemic to Australia.
