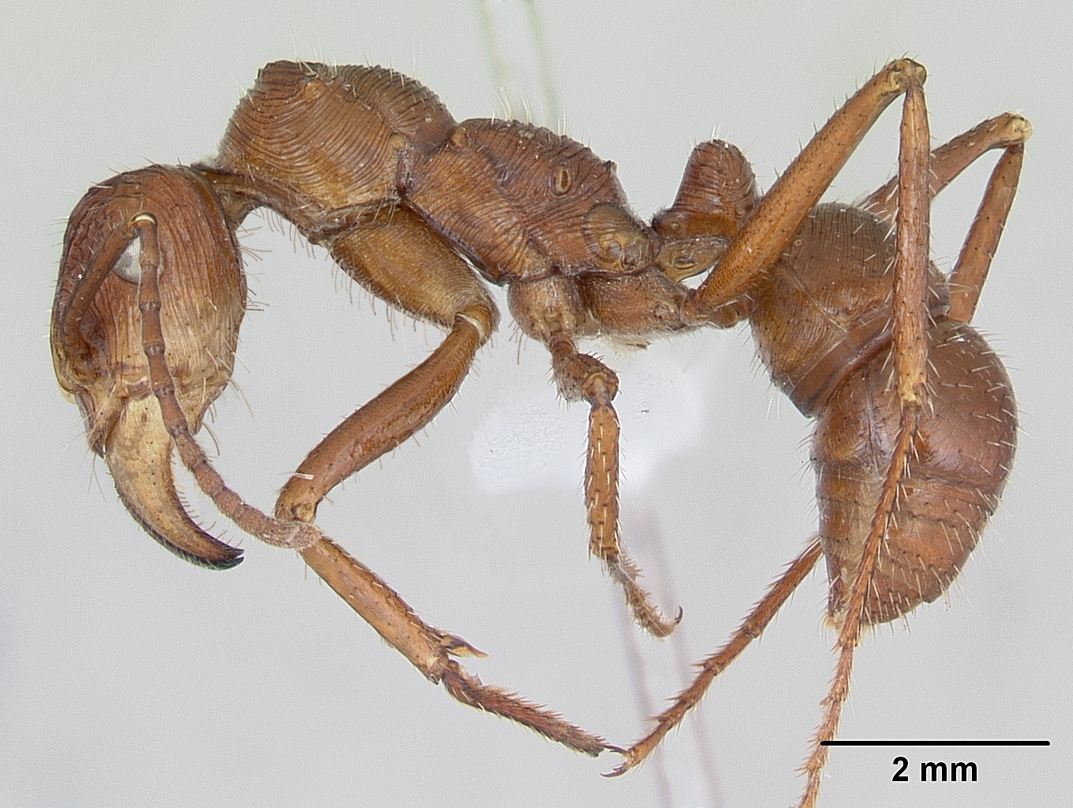
- Ectatomma tuberculatum worker

Scientific classification
- Domain: Eukaryota
- Kingdom: Animalia
- Phylum: Arthropoda
- Class: Insecta
- Order: Hymenoptera
- Family: Formicidae
- Genus: Ectatomma
- Species: E. tuberculatum

Binomial name
- Ectatomma tuberculatum (Olivier, 1792)

= Ectatomma tuberculatum =

Neotropical species of ant

Ectatomma tuberculatum, known in Qʼeqchiʼ as the kelep, is a Neotropical species of ant in the subfamily Ectatomminae. Common in the Neotropics, the species is found from Mexico to Argentina. It is a host to the related social parasite Ectatomma parasiticum, the only known parasitic species in the subfamily Ectatomminae.

== See also ==
- Ectatomin
