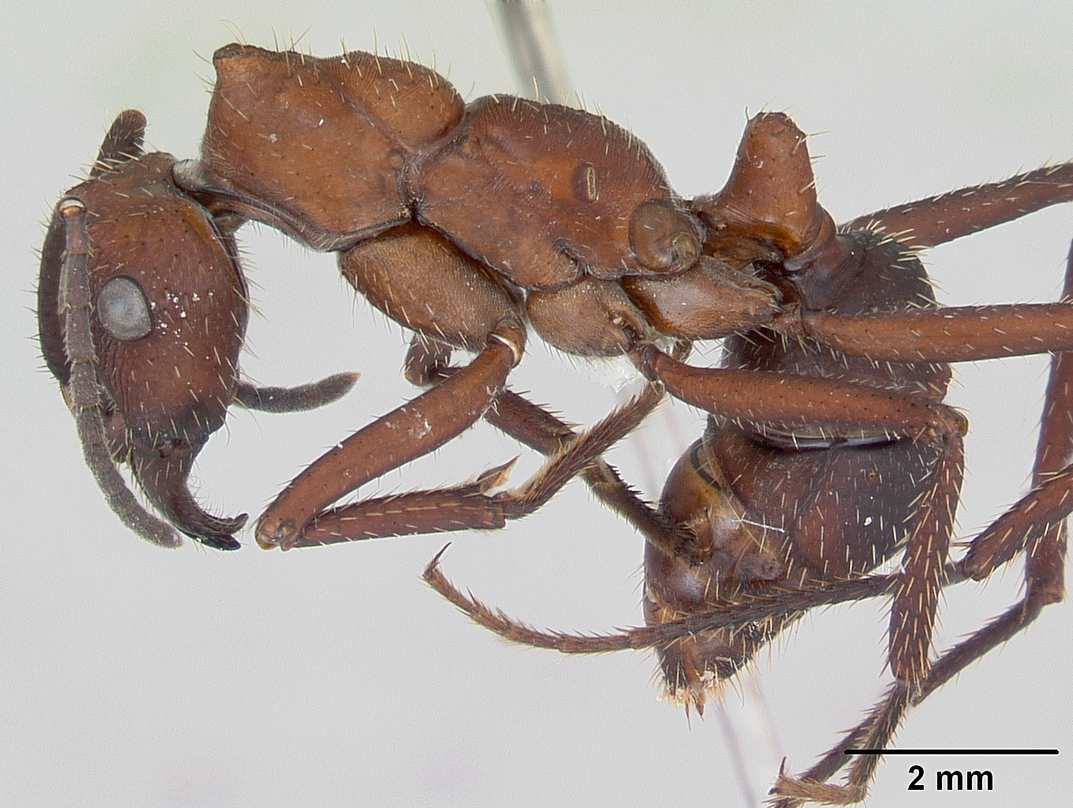

Scientific classification
- Domain: Eukaryota
- Kingdom: Animalia
- Phylum: Arthropoda
- Class: Insecta
- Order: Hymenoptera
- Family: Formicidae
- Genus: Ectatomma
- Species: E. opaciventre

Binomial name
- Ectatomma opaciventre (Roger, 1861)

Synonyms
- Ectatomma opaciventre concolor Santschi, 1919

= Ectatomma opaciventre =

Species of ant

Ectatomma opaciventre is a South American species of ant from the subfamily Ectatomminae. In the Brazilian savannah, nests occur at low density and in specific microhabitats.

== Basic biology ==
E. opaciventre is polydomous. Nests are excavated in soil and can be up be up to 68 cm deep, and comprise multiple sub-chambers.

== Foraging ecology ==
The foraging ecology of E. opaciventre has been studies in detail. Workers forage diurnally, scavenging and predating live arthropods (primarily leaf cutter ants and termites). Opportunistically consuming dead and alive animal protein is typical of Ectatomma. However, E. opaciventre has the least diverse diet of studied ants from the genus, and unlike others, does not collect liquid food. They forage individually, and show individual-level spatial fidelity in foraging habits ('path fidelity').

== Behavior ==
=== Temporal polyethism ===
E. opaciventre exhibits temporal polyethism, with young workers performing more brood care and allogrooming than older workers.

=== Nest relocation ===
In response to disturbance, ants may migrate nest. Various mechanisms are used by different species, including tandem running, pheromone trail laying, and 'adult transport' where workers carry adult nest-mates. E. opaciventre shows exclusively adult transport, with workers (and winged gynes) carrying workers, winged gynes, queens and males. This differs from other closely related species e.g., E. quadridens, which lay trails.

=== Other ===
- Trophic egg laying. Workers appear capable of laying trophic eggs.
- Wallpapering. When a new callows eclose, other workers collect the pupal case ('puparium') and use it to line the nest walls. This behaviour is also documented in other ponerine species
