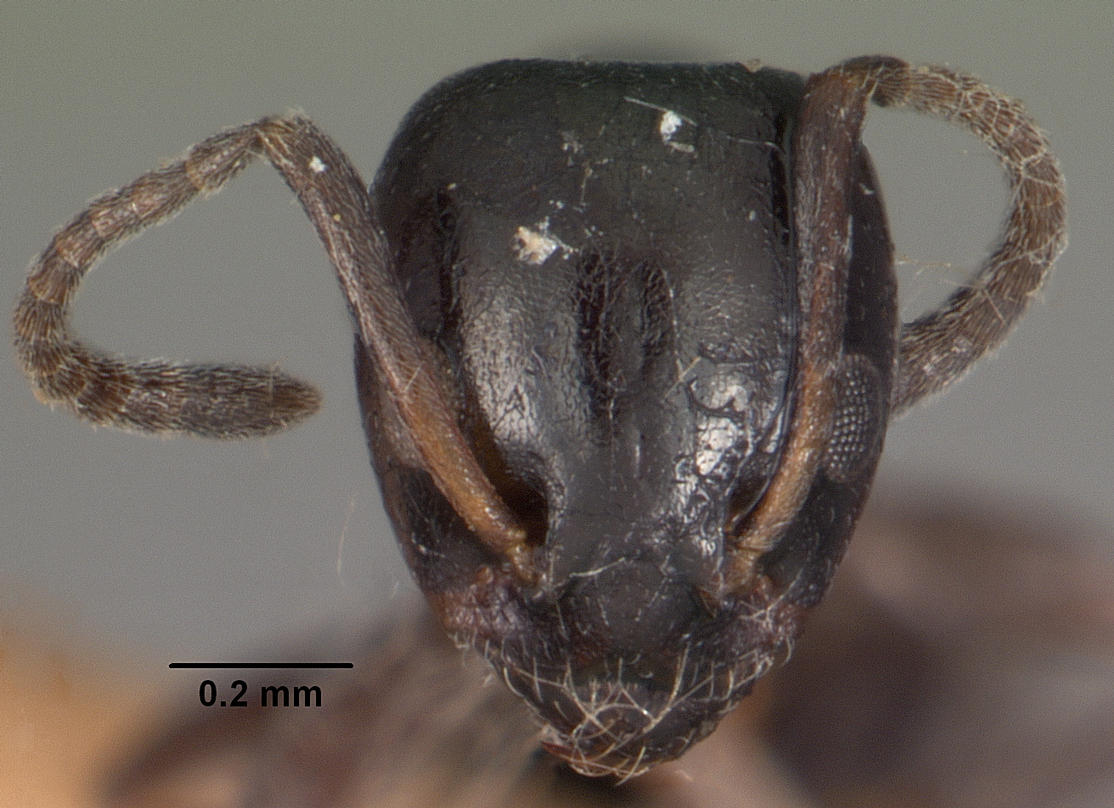

Scientific classification
- Domain: Eukaryota
- Kingdom: Animalia
- Phylum: Arthropoda
- Class: Insecta
- Order: Hymenoptera
- Family: Formicidae
- Subfamily: Dolichoderinae
- Genus: Ochetellus
- Species: O. vinsoni

Binomial name
- Ochetellus vinsoni (Donisthorpe, 1946)

= Ochetellus vinsoni =

Species of ant

Ochetellus vinsoni is a species of ant in the genus Ochetellus. Described by Donisthorpe in 1946, the species is endemic to Mauritius.
