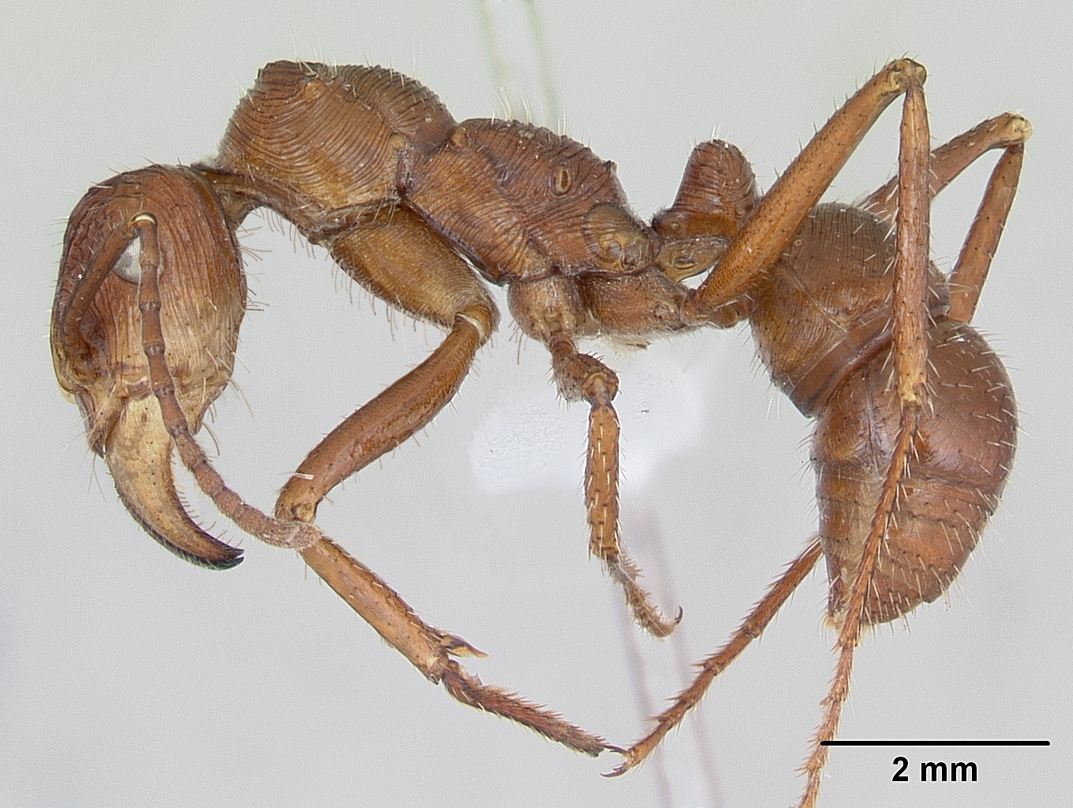
- Ectatomma tuberculatum worker, the type species of the genus

Scientific classification
- Domain: Eukaryota
- Kingdom: Animalia
- Phylum: Arthropoda
- Class: Insecta
- Order: Hymenoptera
- Family: Formicidae
- Subfamily: Ectatomminae
- Tribe: Ectatommini
- Genus: Ectatomma; Smith, 1858

Type species
- Formica tuberculata Olivier, 1792

Diversity
- 16 species

= Ectatomma =

Genus of ants

Ectatomma is a Neotropical genus of ants in the subfamily Ectatomminae. The genus contains 17 described extant species and one extinct species.

== Distribution and habitat ==
Ectatomma is one of the most common genera in the Neotropical region, with most species being South American in their distribution, but others can be found in Central America as well as sparse populations in the Caribbean. Ectatomma may be found in rainforests, savannas, dry environments and cultivated areas.

== Species ==
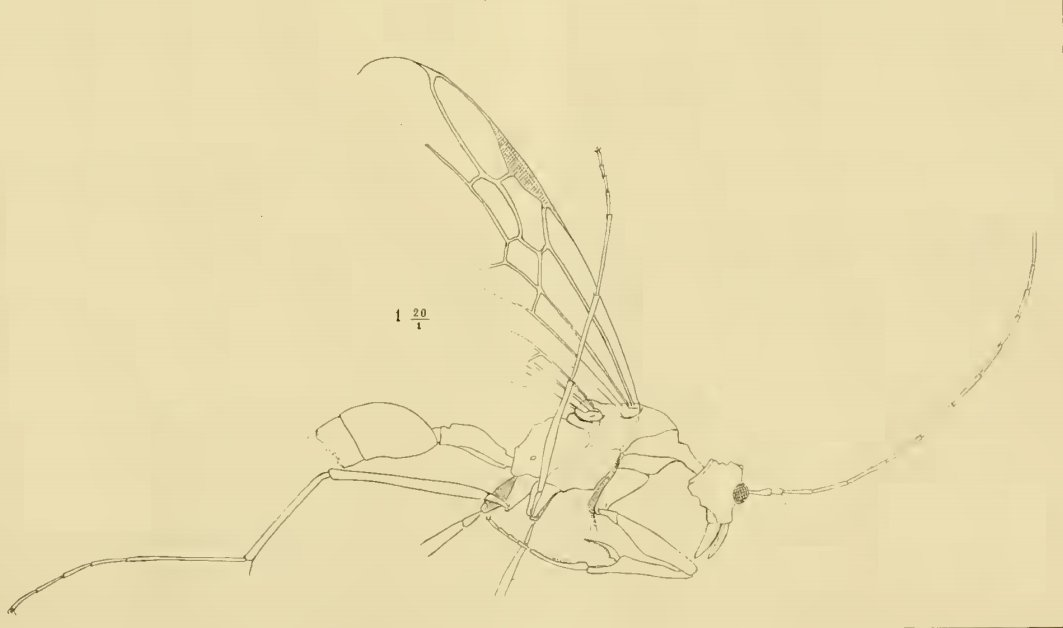
Ectatomma gracile holotype male illustration

- Ectatomma brunneum Smith, 1858
- Ectatomma confine Mayr, 1870
- Ectatomma edentatum Roger, 1863
- Ectatomma gibbum Kugler & Brown, 1982
- Ectatomma goninion Kugler & Brown, 1982
- †Ectatomma gracile Emery, 1891
- Ectatomma lugens Emery, 1894
- Ectatomma muticum Mayr, 1870
- Ectatomma opaciventre (Roger, 1861)
- Ectatomma parasiticum Feitosa & Fresneau, 2008
- Ectatomma permagnum Forel, 1908
- Ectatomma planidens Borgmeier, 1939
- Ectatomma quadridens (Fabricius, 1793)
- Ectatomma ruidum (Roger, 1860)
- Ectatomma suzanae Almeida Filho, 1986
- Ectatomma tuberculatum (Olivier, 1792)
- Ectatomma vizottoi Almeida Filho, 1987

== See also ==
- Pseudectatomma, meaning "false Ectatomma", extinct genus of ants
