= Prorsococcus =

Scientific classification
- Kingdom: Animalia
- Phylum: Arthropoda
- Class: Insecta
- Order: Hemiptera
- Suborder: Sternorrhyncha
- Family: Pseudococcidae
- Genus: Prorsococcus; Williams, 1985
- Species: P. acanthodus

Binomial name
- Prorsococcus acanthodus Williams, 1985

Genus of true bugs

Prorsococcus is a genus of mealybug native to Australia. The genus only contains the single species Prorsococcus acanthodus, described by Williams in 1985. Prorsococcus acanthodus is regularly attended by the ant Ochetellus flavipes, where they will build them shelters from predators.
