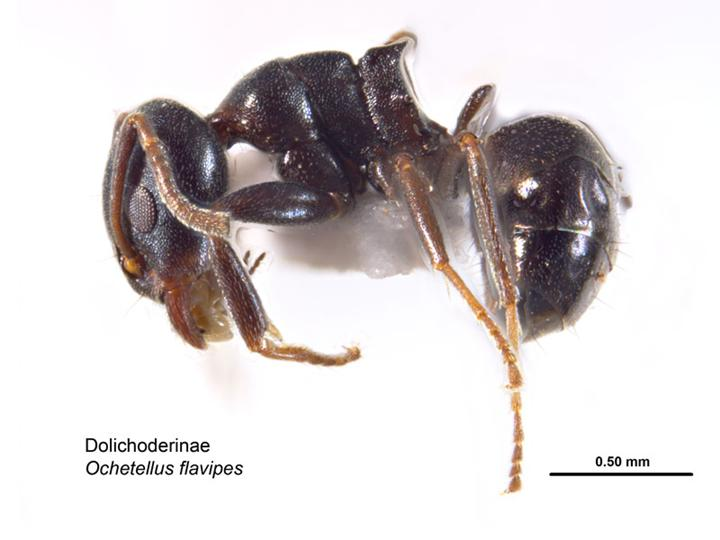

Scientific classification
- Kingdom: Animalia
- Phylum: Arthropoda
- Class: Insecta
- Order: Hymenoptera
- Family: Formicidae
- Subfamily: Dolichoderinae
- Genus: Ochetellus
- Species: O. flavipes

Binomial name
- Ochetellus flavipes (Kirby, 1896)

Synonyms
- Iridomyrmex rostrinotus Forel, 1910

= Ochetellus flavipes =

Species of ant

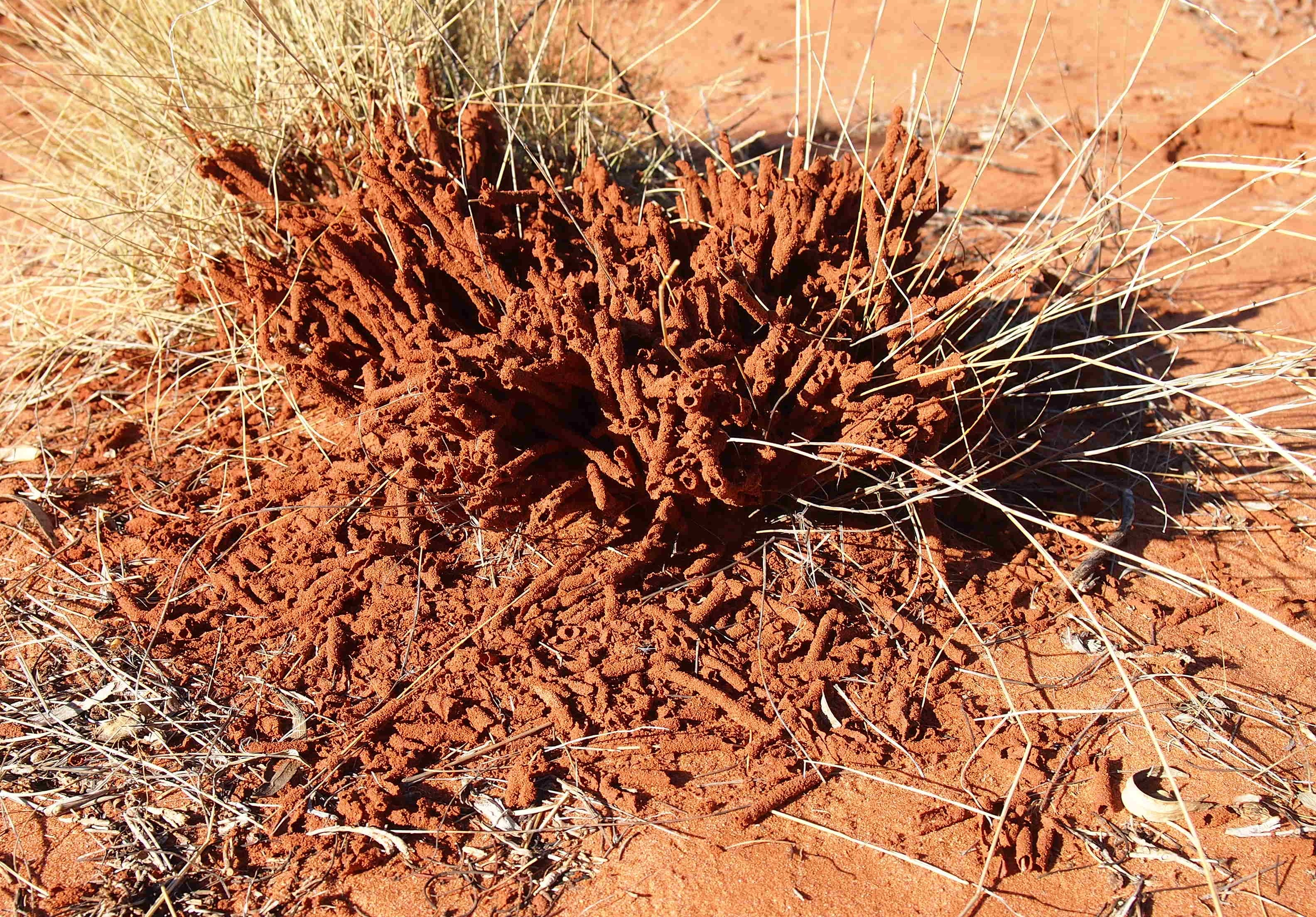
Protective casing to protect mealy bugs built on spinifex by spinifex ants

Ochetellus flavipes, the spinifex ant, is a species of ant in the genus Ochetellus. Described by William Forsell Kirby in 1896, the species is endemic to Australia.
