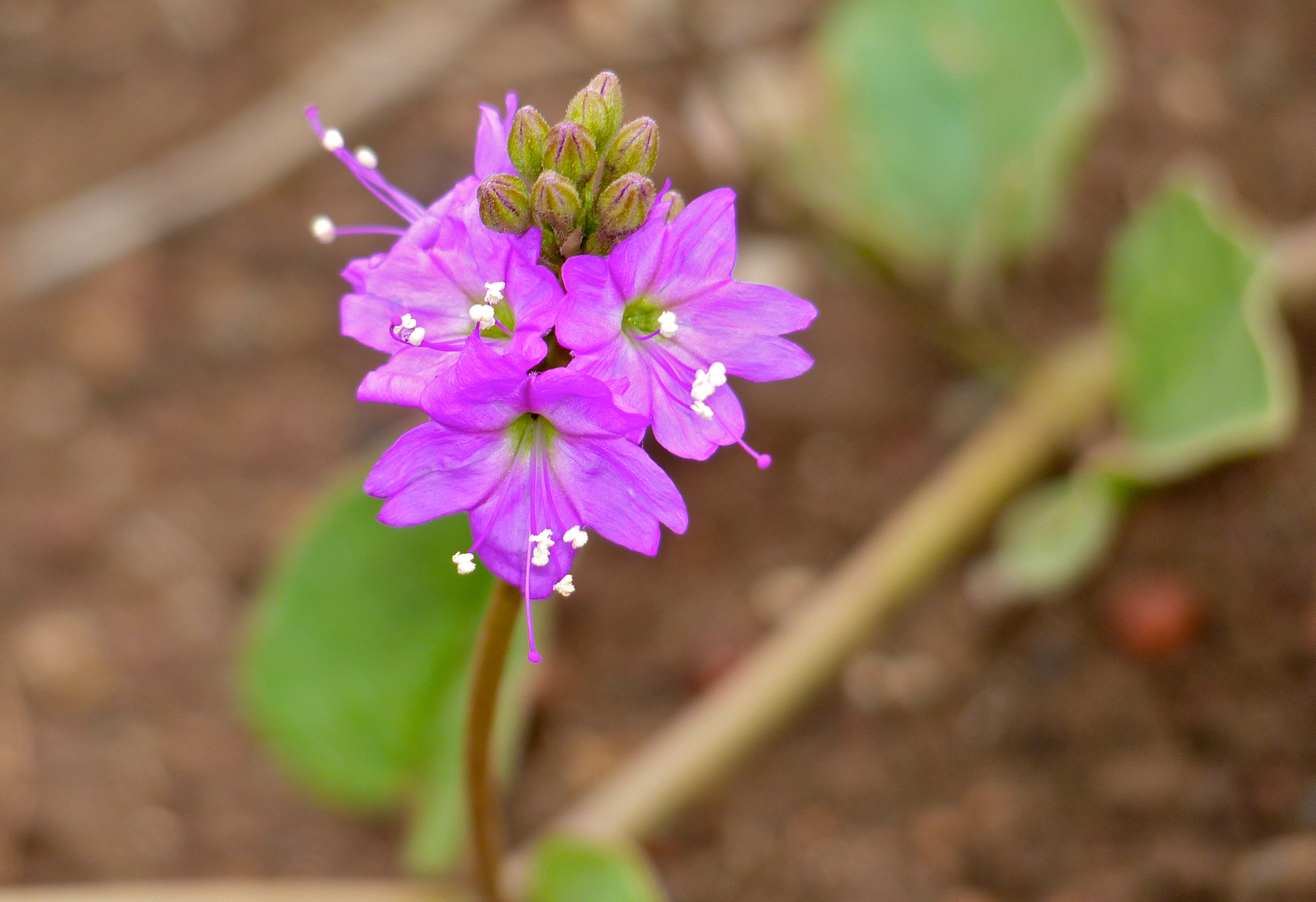
- Flowers of C. pentandrus (Burch.) Heimerl in the Kruger N. P., South Africa

Scientific classification
- Kingdom: Plantae
- Clade: Tracheophytes
- Clade: Angiosperms
- Clade: Eudicots
- Order: Caryophyllales
- Family: Nyctaginaceae
- Tribe: Nyctagineae
- Genus: Commicarpus; Standl.

Type species
- Commicarpus scandens (L.) Standl.

Species
- See text

= Commicarpus =

Genus of flowering plants

Commicarpus is a genus of flowering plants belonging to the family Nyctaginaceae. The genus contain some 30 to 35 species which are native to the tropics and subtropics. Most are found in Africa and western Asia, and eight species are native to southern Africa.

Species of the genus are distinguished from one another by details of the anthocarp and the shape and indumentum of the flower's lower coriaceous (or leathery) part. They grow in soil that is rich in calcium, and especially soil with a strong component of heavy metals.

== Species ==
The genus includes the following species:

- Commicarpus adenensis A.G.Mill.
- Commicarpus ambiguus Meikle
- Commicarpus arabicus Meikle
- Commicarpus australis Meikle
- Commicarpus boissieri (Heimerl) Cufod.
- Commicarpus brandegeei Standl.
- Commicarpus chinensis (L.) Heimerl
- Commicarpus coctoris N.A.Harriman
- Commicarpus decipiens Meikle
- Commicarpus fallacissimus Heimerl Ex Oberm., Schweick. & Verdoorn
- Commicarpus grandiflorus (A.Rich.) Standl.
- Commicarpus greenwayi Meikle
- Commicarpus heimerlii (Vierh.) Meikle
- Commicarpus helenae (Roem. & Schult.) Meikle
- Commicarpus hiranensis Thulin
- Commicarpus insularum Meikle
- Commicarpus lantsangensis D.Q.Lu
- Commicarpus mistus Thulin
- Commicarpus montanus Miré, H.Gillet & Quézel
- Commicarpus parviflorus Thulin
- Commicarpus pedunculosus (A.Rich.) Cufod.
- Commicarpus pentandrus (Burch.) Heimerl
- Commicarpus pilosus (Heimerl) Meikle
- Commicarpus plumbagineus (Cav.) Standl.
- Commicarpus praetermissus N.A.Harriman
- Commicarpus ramosissimus Thulin
- Commicarpus raynalii J.-P.Lebrun & Meikle
- Commicarpus reniformis (Chiov.) Cufod.
- Commicarpus scandens (L.) Standl.
- Commicarpus simonyi (Heimerl & Vierh.) Meikle
- Commicarpus sinuatus Meikle
- Commicarpus squarrosus (Heimerl) Standl.
- Commicarpus stenocarpus (Chiov.) Cufod.
- Commicarpus tuberosus (Lam.) Standl.

Govaerts, Rottbøll and Greuter & Burdet have published several combinations in the genus Boerhavia. If these are followed the genus Commicarpus would be much smaller.

== Gallery ==
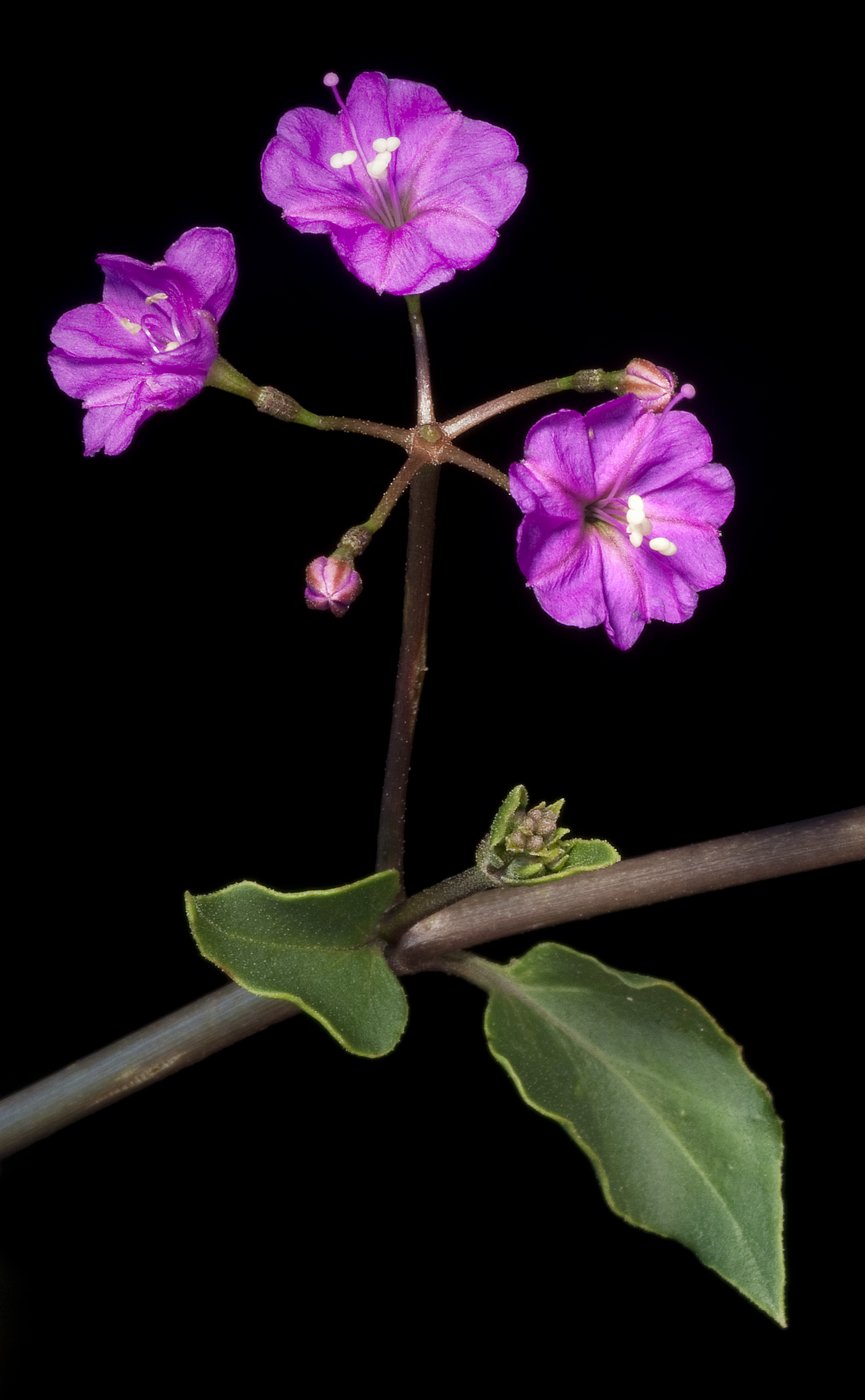
C. australis

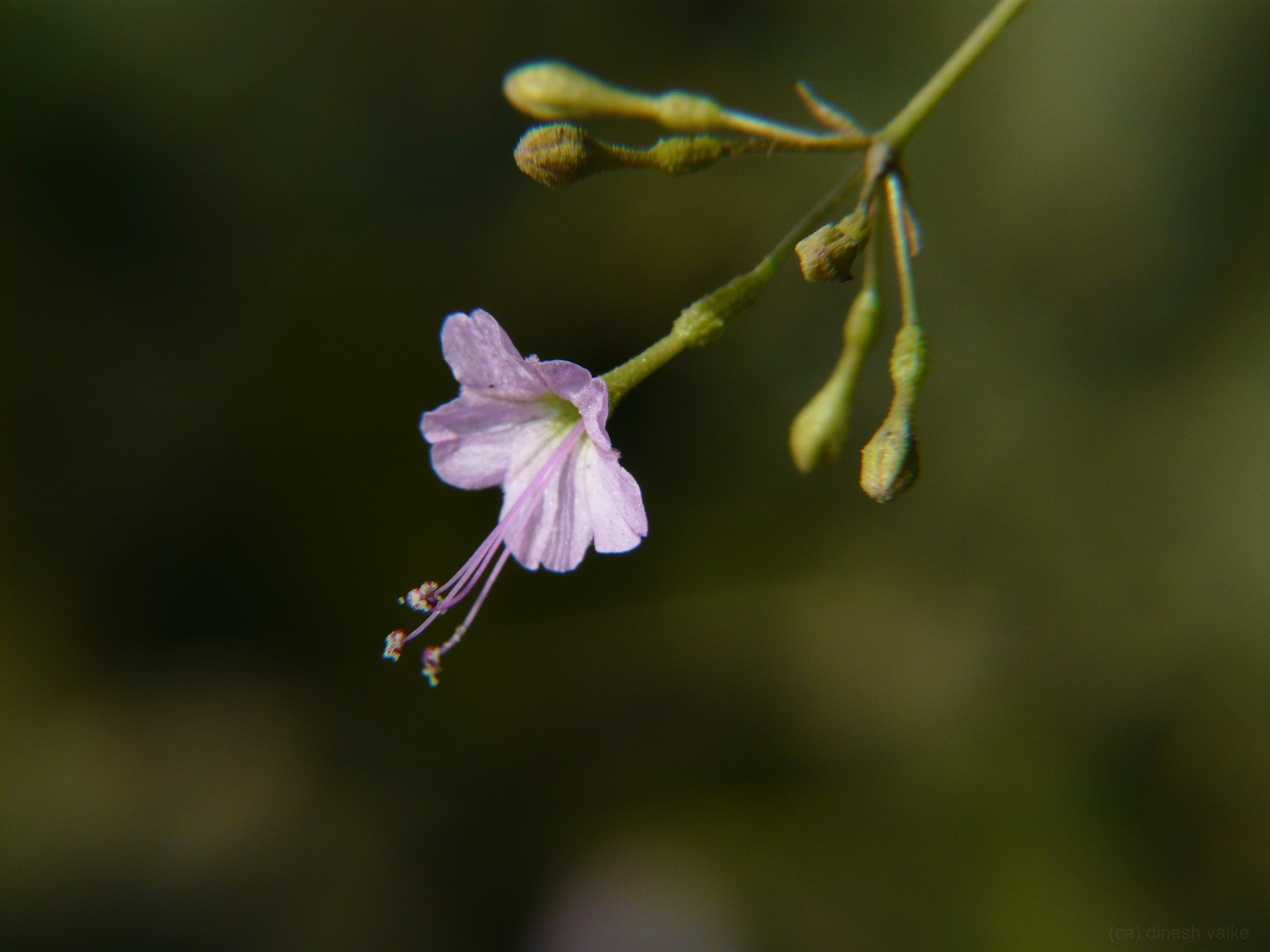
C. chinensis

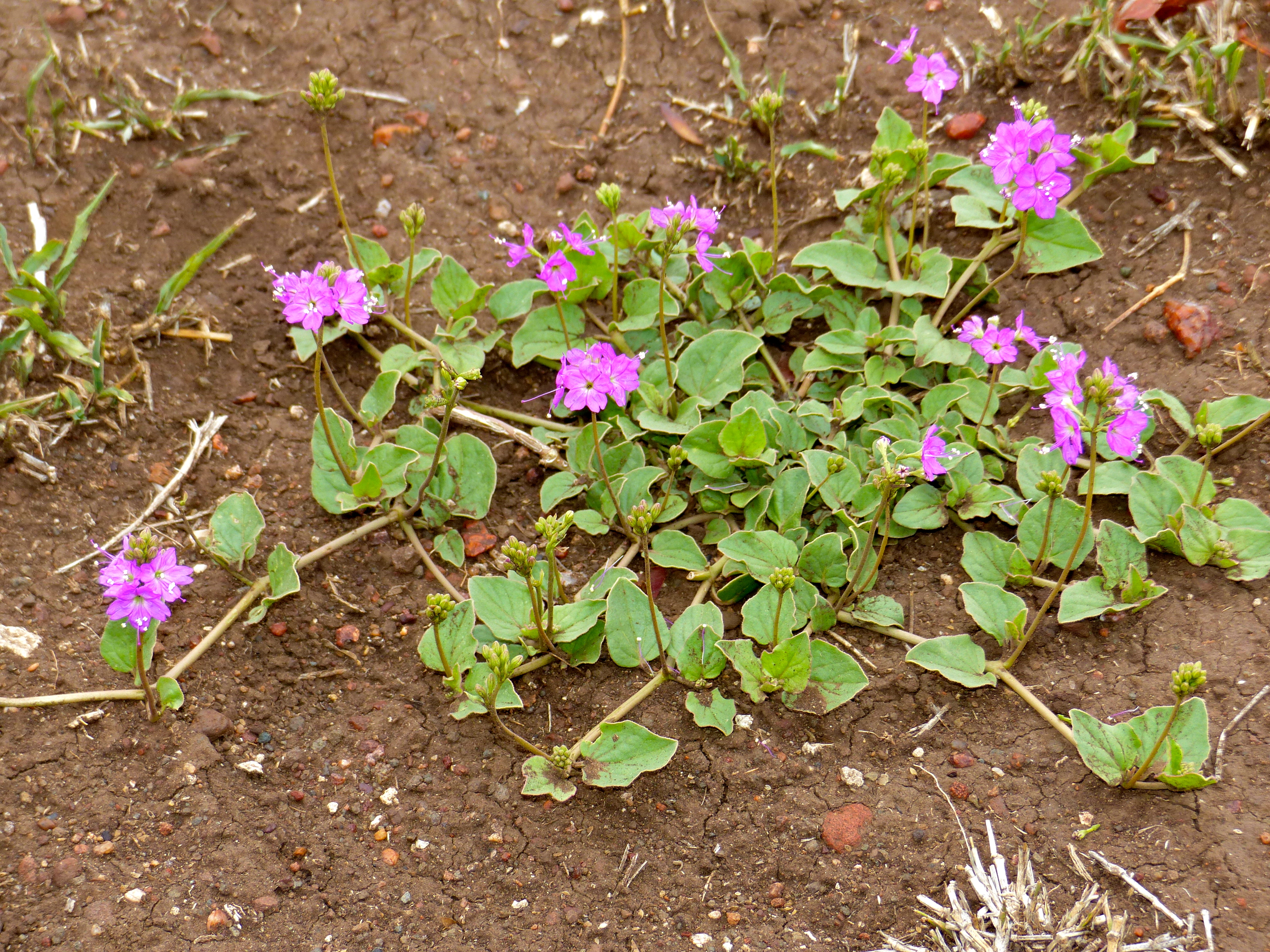
C. pentandrus, habit

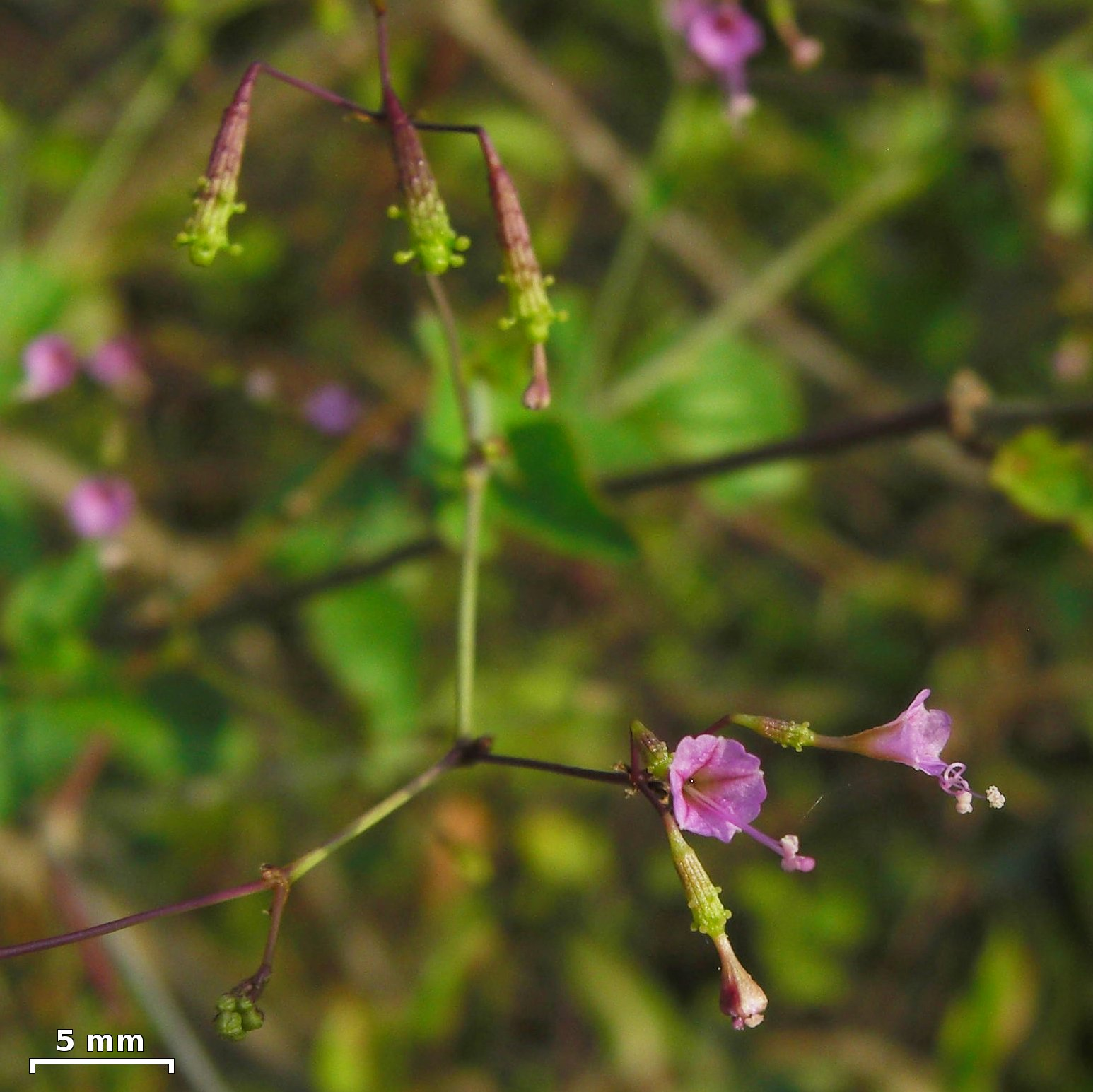
C. tuberosus
