= Monogyny =

Monogyny is a specialised mating system in which a male can only mate with one female throughout his lifetime, but the female may mate with more than one male. In this system, the males generally provide no paternal care. In many spider species that are monogynous, the males have two copulatory organs, which allows them to mate a maximum of twice throughout their lifetime. As is commonly seen in honeybees, ants and certain spider species, a male may put all his energy into a single copulation, knowing that this will lower his overall fitness. During copulation, monogynous males have adapted to cause self genital damage or even death to increase their chances of paternity.

== Definition and distinction ==
Monogyny is one of several mating systems observed in nature, in which a male mates only once; females, however, may mate with multiple males. It is important to emphasize the distinctions between monogyny and polyandry, and monogyny and monogamy. Polyandry is a mating system by which a female mates with more than one male; the male, in turn, can also mate with more than one female. In a monogamous setting, both male and female consent to having only one mate at any one time and thus mate only with that partner for that time period. Hence, monogyny is sometimes referred to as male monogamy because the male only mates with one female.

== Examples ==
The mating system of monogyny is most common in ants, honeybees, and spiders.

=== In colony species ===
In species of ants and honeybees, there is only one female queen who mates with all the males in her colony; the males attend to the queen and mate only with her. There are circumstances, however, where a colony can become queenless, and therefore certain males must adapt to this surrounding in order to increase paternity. In ants and honeybees, there are two different types of monogynous settings. Type A are monogynous, queenright colonies where the queen is the mated female and everyone else is unmated. Type B are monogynous, worker-reproductive colonies where there is no queen, but rather there are gamergates, which are mated workers who take on a queen-like role. The queen is normally the only egg producer. However, when a colony becomes queenless, some workers which have intact, undeveloped ovaries may develop them and thus become capable of laying more eggs. So in certain colonies, a singly mated worker called a gamergate reproduces as the functional queen in that colony. These workers are termed "totipotent"; that is, they are able to change and adapt to a different surrounding in which they no longer have a queen.

=== In spiders ===
Males in certain species of spiders often employ drastic methods to be paternally successful. Monogyny in spiders culminates in extreme traits, such as dramatic male self-sacrifice and emasculation of the male by the female during copulation. Since males only mate with one female in a monogynous setting, each individual male must do whatever it takes to increase his particular paternity success, even if it means sacrificing himself. Male redback spiders twist their abdomens onto the fangs of their mates during copulation and, if cannibalized (65% of matings), increase their paternity relative to males that are not cannibalized. In this way, males of the redback spiders in a monogynous setting increase their chance of paternity by actually surrendering themselves to be cannibalized by the female.

== Male sacrifice tactics ==
=== Genital plugging ===
The benefits of mate guarding and securing paternity are higher than searching for many mates in a monogynous system. A male securing his paternity becomes a male's first priority during reproduction. One way they mate guard is by creating a physical barrier to turn away any other males. The male can cause severe physical damage to themselves by breaking off their pedipalps in order to plug the genital opening of the female. Males of Argiope bruennichi remove their pedipalp into the females and thus reduce the risk of sperm competition. Males can also remove the sperm of a previous mate from the female and deposit their own sperm, increasing their likelihood of success in that copulation. In the golden orb spider, the male may sacrifice both of his copulatory organs in one mating in order to turn away any wandering males. In other cases, we see the casting off of other body parts such as the anterior legs in the golden orb spider when the male is attacked by an aggressive female. By doing this, he can continue to mate with her while she eats his legs and does not eat him whole.

=== Self sacrifice and cannibalism ===
Copulation in a monogynous male is a sacrificial system. They not only cause genital damage to themselves but, in many cases, die during copulation spontaneously such as Argiope aurantia or are cannibalized by the female. This can be observed in many spider species, such as the red back spider which consumes the male either during or right after copulation if the male is not quick enough to escape. The size and age of the female play a role in whether or not the male is able to escape. They usually are not successful in the attempt to escape if the female is older and heavier making her much more dominant than the male. Another factor in the survival or demise of the male is the duration of the copulation. If there is a high copulation time the chances of him being eaten are much higher. If the copulation has a duration of ten seconds or more, the chances of him being eaten are much greater than those that jump off before ten seconds. Monogyny increases a male's chance of paternity when there is a male biased ratio in the population. When males make up a large majority of the population, the likelihood of finding multiple females is slim. Thus the males will mate with the first female they encounter. Mate guarding her from other males is more beneficial than looking for another female because the odds of meeting another female in a male biased population are against him.

== Costs and benefits ==
From a male standpoint, evolutionary theory suggests that the focus of mating is to enhance paternity in order to produce viable offspring. Therefore, sexual selection theory would suggest that a male should attempt to mate with several females. This means that if a male wants to ensure that he will be paternally successful, he should mate with more than one female. When the sex ratio is male biased, however, male monogamy (monogyny) would arise as a means of increasing paternity and producing offspring; in other words, if the setting contains a sex ratio of all male to one female, then monogyny would arise as a means to produce offspring. This model predicts that a male-biased sex ratio is required for monogyny to evolve.

- For females: the advantages and benefits are significant to that of males and are clear and obvious. The monogynous female is dominant over the males and has great reproductive value.
- For males: Since they can mate with only one female, they must adapt in order to increase their chance of paternity.

== Male adaptation ==
Males can adapt in order to increase paternity in a monogynous setting. An example of this would be the formation of gamergates in a queenless colony of honeybees and/or ants. Another example would be male-sacrifice in order to increase paternity in certain species of spiders. The costs of increasing paternity in a monogynous setting are great for the males; in certain species of spiders the male will surrender himself to be cannibalized in order to increase paternity. In this respect, the benefit for the female is that she will receive the chance to eat if she is hungry; the cost for the male is the loss of life to increase his paternity.

In certain species, male adaptation will include the process of pedipalp damage. Males in species of the golden orb weaver, for instance, can protect their paternity by obstructing the female's genital openings with fragments of their copulatory organs. The male will actively participate in damaging his genitals by breaking off parts of his copulatory organs during mating and obstructing the female's genital openings in order to be paternally successful.

== Evolutionary significance ==
Male animals, especially in species where males provide little or no parental investment (time and energy invested in current offspring at the expense of future offspring), are generally expected to maximize their fitness by mating with several females. In certain monogynous settings, however, paternal investment by the male is greater than that of males in other mating systems because the benefits of paternal protection exceed those of searching for additional mates. Paternal investment includes even dramatic examples such as the remarkable adaptation of male sacrifice via sexual cannibalism and the ability to inflict genital damage on oneself to increase paternity success. In these circumstances, selection may favor extreme mechanisms of paternity protection that amount to a maximal investment in a single mating.

There are also circumstances in which monogyny evolves when males do not provide any paternal investment. Researchers have focused on sexual behaviour in systems where males have low paternal investment but frequently mate only once in their lifetimes, after which they are often killed by the female. Mating effort is high for these males. In particular, time and energy costs or risks incurred by males in securing a given mating could decrease the relative number of males available for mating; this type of mating is called non-promiscuous. Researchers have focused on species of web-building spiders with males that show high levels of non-promiscuous mating effort but apparently low paternal investment. The mechanism of male monogamy (monogyny) in these species is indisputably the most extreme form of non-promiscuous mating effort.
